This is a list of television programmes that are currently being broadcast or have been broadcast on ABC Television's ABC TV (formerly ABC1), ABC TV Plus (formerly ABC2 and ABC Comedy), ABC Kids (formerly ABC 4 Kids), ABC Me (formerly ABC3) or ABC News (Australian TV channel) (formerly ABC News 24) in Australia.

Current programming

Domestic

News and current affairs

Local productions
ABC News 7pm weeknights in NSW/ACT/QLD/VIC/SA/NT/WA/TAS (1956–present)
National programs produced in Sydney
7.30 (2011–present)
ABC News Mornings (2010–present on ABC and ABC News)
ABC News at Noon (2005–present on ABC and ABC News)
ABC News Afternoons (2010–present on ABC News)
ABC Late News (2018–present)
Australian Story (1996–present)
The Business (2006–present)
The Drum (2010–present)
Foreign Correspondent (1992–present)
Four Corners (1961–present)
Landline (1991–present)
The Mix (2014–present)
One Plus One (2013–present)
Planet America (2012–2013, 2016–present)
Q&A (2008–present)
Weekend Breakfast (2012–present)
National programs produced in Melbourne
ABC News at Five (2012–present)
China Tonight (2021–present)
Insiders (2001–present)
News Breakfast (2008–2011 on ABC2, 2011–present on ABC)
The World (2010–present)

Drama
 Fires (2021–present)
 Harrow (2018–present)
 The Heights (2019–present)
 Jack Irish (2012–present)
 Mystery Road (2018–present)
 The Newsreader (2021–present)
 Savage River (2022–present)
 Significant Others (2022–present)
 Total Control (2019–present)
 Troppo (2022–present)

Comedy
 All My Friends Are Racist (2021–present)
 Black Comedy (2014–present)
 Content (2019–present on iView)
 Fisk (2021–present on iView)
 Frayed (2019–present)
 The Letdown (2016–present)
 Preppers (2021–present)
 Question Everything (2021–present)
 Sammy J's Democratic Party (2017–present)
 Summer Love (2022–present)
 Tomorrow Tonight (2018, 2022–present)
 Utopia (2014–present)

Entertainment
 The ABC Of (2022–present)
 Anh's Brush with Fame (2016–present)
 Back in Time for Dinner (2018–present)
 Comedy Next Gen (2017–present on ABC Comedy)
 Escape from the City (2019–present)
 Gruen (2008–present)
 Hard Quiz (2016–present)
 Julia Zemiro's Home Delivery (2013–present)
 Just Between Us: There’s Something I Want To Tell You (2021–present)
 Take 5 With Zan Rowe (2022–present)
 The Weekly with Charlie Pickering (2015–present)
 Win the Week (2021–present)
 You Can't Ask That (2016–present)

Factual / documentary
 Australia Remastered (2020–present)
 Ask the Doctor (2017–present)
 A Dog's World (2022–present)
 Back to Nature (2021–present)
 Back Roads (2015–present)
 Beyond the Towers (2021–present)
 Big Deal (2021)
 Books that Made Us (2021–present)
 Catalyst (2001–present)
 Compass (1988–present)
 The Cult of the Family (2019)
 Decoding Danger (2021)
 Designing A Legacy (2021–present)
 Employable Me (2018–present)
 Gardening Australia (1990–present)
 Grand Designs Australia
 Inside the Sydney Opera House (2022–present)
 Magical Land of Oz (2019–present)
 Media Watch (1989–2000, 2002–present)
 Meet the Penguins (2022–present)
 Movin' to the Country (2021–present)
 Muster Dogs (2022–present)
 Old People's Home for 4 Year Olds (2019—present)
 Old People's Home for Teenagers (2022–present)
 Outback Ringer (2020–present)
 The People's Republic of Mallacoota (2021–present)
 The Recording Studio (2019–present)
 Restoration Australia (2015, 2019–present)
 The School That Tried to End Racism (2021–present)
 Southern Ocean Live (2022–present)
 Stargazing Live (2017–present)
 War on Waste (2017–present)

Arts
 Art Works (2021–present)
 Everyone's A Critic (2018–present)
 Tiny Oz (2022–present)

Children's programs on ABC Me
 100% Wolf: Legend of the Moonstone (2020–present)
 Behind the News (1969–2003, 2005–present on ABC Me)
 Big Blue (2022–present)
 Born to Spy (2021–present)
 Built to Survive (2022–present)
 Cartoon It Up (2016–present on ABC Me)
 Create (2017–present on ABC ME)
 Definitely Not News (2020–present)
 First Day (2020–present)
 Good Game: Spawn Point (2010–present on ABC Me)
 Hardball (2019–present)
 Itch (2020–present)
 MaveriX (2022–present)
 Mikki vs The World (2021–present)
 Mustangs FC (2017–present)
 The PM's Daughter (2022–present)
 Reef School (2023–present)
 Space Nova (2021–present)
 Spongo, Fuzz and Jalapeña (2019–present)
 The Strange Chores (2019–present)
 The InBESTigators (2019–present on ABC Me)
 The New Legends of Monkey (2018–present)
 Thalu (2020 on ABC ME)

Preschool programs on ABC Kids
 Bluey (2018–present)
 Beep and Mort (2022–present)
 Get Grubby TV (2014–present)
 Hoot Hoot Go! (2016–present on ABC Kids)
 Ginger & the Vegesaurus (2022–present)
 Kangaroo Beach (2021–present)
 Kazoops! (2016–present)
 Little J & Big Cuz (2019–present on ABC Kids)
 Play School (1966–present on ABC Kids)
 Pencil Pals (2020–present)
 Ready, Steady, Wiggle!
 Wiggle, Wiggle Wiggle!
 The Wonder Gang

Music
 Rage (1987–present)
 The Set (2018–present)
 The Sound (2020)
 Spicks and Specks (2005–2011, 2014, 2013, 2021–present)

Sports Talk
 Offsiders (2006–present)
 That Pacific Sport Show (2020–present)

Sport

 Golf: Women's Australian Open, Australian Ladies Masters
 Basketball: Women's National Basketball League

Annual events
 Australian of the Year Awards
 Melbourne International Comedy Festival specials (1998–2016 on Ten, 2017–present on ABC)
 Royal Edinburgh Military Tattoo
 Sydney Gay and Lesbian Mardi Gras (1994–1997, 2022–present)
 Sydney New Year's Eve Fireworks (1995–2006 on Nine, 2007–2008 on Ten, 2009–2013 on Nine, 2014–present on ABC)
 Tropfest (previously on Nine, 2007–2010 on Movie Extra, 2011–2013 on SBS, 2014–2016 on SBS2, 2017 on Eleven, 2018–present on ABC Comedy)

Other
 National Press Club Address
 Question Time

Foreign

Animation
 Archer
 The Legend of Korra
 Wallace and Gromit (during Easter and Christmas)

Anime
 Boruto: Naruto Next Generations
 Dragon Ball Super
 Fruits Basket (2019)
 Log Horizon
 Radiant
 Sailor Moon Crystal

Drama
 All Creatures Great and Small (originally aired on BritBox)
 At Home with the Braithwaites
 Beautiful People
 Blue Water Empire
 Class (Doctor Who spinoff)
 Death in Paradise
 The Larkins
 Life
 Starstruck
 The Teacher
 War of the Worlds (originally aired on Foxtel)

Comedy
 Absolutely Fabulous
 Ackley Bridge
 At Home with the Braithwaites
 Catastrophe
 The Catherine Tate Show
 Death in Paradise
 Mock the Week
 Red Dwarf
 Whose Line Is It Anyway?
 Would I Lie to You?

Variety / entertainment
 Alan Carr: Chatty Man
 Penn and Teller: Fool Us
 The Tonight Show Starring Jimmy Fallon

Observational / documentaries
 David Attenborough Specials (Shared with Nine Network and Network 10)

Lifestyle
 George Clarke's Amazing Spaces
 Grand Designs
 Grand Designs New Zealand

Other
 Doc Martin
 Heart and Soul
 Hope Springs
 How Not to Live Your Life
 The Jonathan Ross Show
 The Last Leg
 Midsomer Murders
 Never Mind the Buzzcocks
 Parkinson
 Silent Witness
 Songs of Praise

Children's

 72 Cutest Animals
 ABC Singsong
 According to Kids
 The Adventures of Paddington
 The Adventures of Puss in Boots
 All Hail King Julien
 Almost Naked Animals
 Alphablocks
 Aliens Love Underpants And...
 Ali-A's Superchargers
 Alva's World
 Andy's Dinosaur Adventures
 Andy's Safari Adventures
 Andy's Wild Workouts
 Antiks
 Arthur (Shared with PBS Kids)
 Athleticus
 Baby Jake
 The Bagel and Becky Show
 The Beachbuds
 Becca's Bunch
 The Beet Party
 Best Bugs Forever
 Bing
 Big Block SingSong
 Big Blue
 Big Words Small Stories
 Bob the Builder (2015 series) 
 Book Hungry Bears
 Bottersnikes and Gumbles (originally aired on Seven)
 Brave Bunnies (later moved to Cartoon Network)
 Buddi
 Camp Lakebottom
 Chuggington
 Clangers (2015 series)
 Cleopatra in Space
 Cloudy with a Chance of Meatballs
 Danger Mouse
 Daniel Tiger's Neighborhood (Shared with PBS Kids)
 The Day Henry Met
 The Day My Butt Went Psycho! (originally aired on Nine)
 Deadly 60
 The Deep (originally aired on Seven)
 Degrassi: The Next Generation
 The Dengineers
 Dennis & Gnasher: Unleashed!
 Digby Dragon
 Dinosaur Train (originally aired on Eleven)
 Dinotrux
 Dino Dana
 Dogstar (originally aired on Nine)
 Dog Loves Books
 Dorg Van Dango
 Dot.
 The Drawing Show
 DreamWorks Dragons
 Droners
 Dwight in Shining Armor
 Emma!
 I, Elvis Riboldi
 Endangered Species
 The Fairly OddParents
 Find Me in Paris
 Floogals
 FriendZSpace
 The Furchester Hotel
 Get Blake!
 Go Jetters
 Grace's Amazing Machines
 Gym Stars
 "Hanazuki: Full of Treasures" 
 Hey Duggee
 The Hive
 Hoopla Doopla!
 Horrible Histories (2015 series)
 In the Night Garden...
 I'm a Creepy Crawly
 I'm a Fish
 Keeko
 Kiddets
 Kiri and Lou
 Kong: King of the Apes
 Kung Fu Panda: Legends of Awesomeness
 Kuu Kuu Harajuku (originally aired on Eleven)
 Lah-Lah's Adventures
 Larry the Wonderpup (originally aired on Seven)
 League of Super Evil
 Learning Time with Timmy
 The Legend of Korra
 Lily's Driftwood Bay
 Little Princess
 Little Big Awesome
 Little Roy
 Love Monster
 Luo Bao Bei
 MathXplosion
 Malory Towers
 Massive Monster Mayhem
 Matilda and the Ramsay Bunch
 Mecha Builders
 Miffy's Adventures Big and Small
 Mighty Mike
 Miraculous: Tales of Ladybug and Cat Noir
 Mister Maker
 Mister Maker Around the World
 Mister Maker's Arty Party
 Molly of Denali
 Molly and Mack
 Moon and Me
 Moka's Fabulous Adventures
 Nella the Princess Knight
 Nerds and Monsters
 The Next Step
 Noddy, Toyland Detective (shared with DreamWorks channel)
 Numberblocks
 Numb Chucks
 The Numtums
 Octonauts
 Odd Squad
 Oddbods
 Olobob Top
 Operation Ouch!
 Pablo
 The Penguins of Madagascar (originally aired on Ten)
 Peppa Pig
 Pet Superstars
 Peter Rabbit
 Pfffirates
 Pingu in the City (shared with Boomerang)
 Pip & Posy
 Pipi, Pupu & Rosmary
 PJ Masks
 Pocoyo
 Pompon Little Bear
 Postman Pat Special Delivery Service (later moved to DreamWorks Channel)
 Rainbow Chicks
 Rastamouse
 Rated A for Awesome
 Ready Jet Go!
 Remy & Boo
 Rise of the Teenage Mutant Ninja Turtles
 Rita and Crocodile
 Robot Wars
 Roy
 The Rubbish World of Dave Spud
 Rusty Rivets
 Sadie Sparks
 Sarah and Duck
 School of Rock
 Scream Street
 Secret Life of Boys
 Sesame Street (1970–present)
 Shaun the Sheep
 SheZow
 Sir Mouse
 Slugterra
 Spirit Riding Free
 Small Potatoes (2011 series)
 So Awkward
 storyTree
 Sunny Bunnies
 Super Dinosaur
 Supernoobs
 Teenage Mutant Ninja Turtles (2012 series)
 Teletubbies
 This is Scarlett and Isaiah
 Thomas & Friends (original Series) (shared with CBeebies)
 Thomas & Friends: All Engines Go!
 Thunderbirds Are Go
 Timmy Time
 Tik Tak
 Tish Tash
 Total DramaRama
 Twirlywoos
 Voltron: Legendary Defender
 Wallykazam!
 The Wacky Word Show
 Waffle the Wonder Dog
 Wanda and The Alien
 Waybuloo
 Wishfart
 The Zoo
 Zack and Quack

Upcoming programming

Domestic
 Aunty Donna's Coffee Cafe (comedy, 2023)
 Australia’s Wild Odyssey (factual/doco, 24 January 2023)
 Back in Time for the Corner Shop (entertainment, 2023)
 Bay of Fires (drama, 2023)
 Better Date Than Never (factual/doco, 24 January 2023)
 The Black Hand (factual/doco, 2023)
 Crazy Fun Park (children's, 2023)
 The Disposables (children's, 2023)
 Dolphins: Is Our Love Too Deep? (factual/doco, 2023)
 First Weapons (factual/doco, 2023)
 Gardening Australia Jnr. (children's, 2023)
 Gold Diggers (comedy, 2023)
 Goodwood (drama, 2022)
 Great Australian Stuff (factual/doco, 2023)
 House of Gods (drama, 2023)
 In Our Blood (drama, 2023)
 Folau (documentary, 2023)
 Kitchen Cabinet (entertainment 2012–2016, 2023)
 Knowing the Score (factual/doco, 2023)
 Limbo (comedy, 2023)
 The Messenger (drama, 2023)
 Mother and Son (comedy, 1984–1994, 2023–)
 New Leash on Life (factual/doco, 2023)
 Ningaloo Nyinggulu (factual/doco, 2023)
 No Stupid Questions (working title) (comedy, 2023)
 Platypus Guardian (factual/doco, 2023)
 Queerstralia (factual/doco, 2023)
 The Spooky Files (children's, 2023) 
 Turn Up The Volume (children's, 2023)
 Whiteley on Trial (factual/doco, 2023)
 Wildlifers! (children's, 2023)

Foreign
 16 Hudson (preschool)
 3 Amigonauts (children's)
 44 Cats (children's)
 Alma's Way (Children's)
 Alvinnn!!! and the Chipmunks (children's)
 Big Time Rush (Children's)
 The Boss Baby: Back in Business (children's)
 The Dog And Pony Show (children's)
 Fetch! With Ruff Ruffman (Children's)
 Fraggle Rock: Back to the Rock (preschool)
 Glowbies (preschool)
 Go Away, Unicorn! (Children's)
 Harvey Beaks (children's)
 How to Rock (Children's)
 I Am Frankie (Children's)
 Kate & Mim Mim (preschool)
 The Lingo Show (preschool)
 Little Charmers (children's)
 Looped (children's)
 Nate Is Late (Children's)
 Nina and the Neurons (Preschool)
 Ollie's Pack (children's)
 Oggy and the Cockroaches (children's)
 Pikwik Pack (preschool)
 Pinocchio and Friends (preschool)
 PINY: Institute of New York (children's)
 Rabbids Invasion (children's)
 Rainbow Butterfly Unicorn Kitty (children's)
 The Remarkable Mr King (Children's)
 Rocket Monkeys (children's)
 Rosie's Rules (Preschool)
 Space Chickens in Space (children's)
 Squish (children's)
 Supertato (children's)
 Super Why (children's)
 Super Wish (Children's)
 Tractor Tom (preschool)
 Where's Wally (children's)
 Wild Kratts (Children's)
 Yin Yang Yo! (Children's)

Previous programming

Domestic

News & Current Affairs

 7 Days (2001–2005)
 The 7.30 Report (1986–2011)
 Asia Pacific Focus (2001–2014)
 Australia Wide (2005–2017)
 Business Breakfast (2002–2003)
 The Carleton/Walsh Report (1985–1987)
 Difference of Opinion (2007)
 FAQ (1999–2000)
 First Edition (1993–1996)
 George Negus Tonight (2001–2004)
 Inside Business (2002–2013)
 The Investigators (1985–1995)
 Lateline (1990–2017)
 Lateline Business (2006–2010)
 The Link (2017)
 Matter of Fact with Stan Grant (2018)
 The National (1985–1986)
 Nationwide (1979–1984)
 Open Hearing (1960–1961)
 Stateline (1996–2011)
 This Day Tonight (1967–1978)
 Weekend Magazine

Drama

 1915 (1982)
 A Difficult Woman (1998)
 Adventures of the Seaspray (1967)
 All the Green Year (1980)
 An Accidental Soldier (2013)
 And Here Comes Bucknuckle (1981)
 Answered by Fire (2006)
 ANZAC Girls (2014)
 Australian Playhouse (1966–1967)
 Barons (2022)
 Bastard Boys (2007)
 Beat of the City (1975)
 The Beautiful Lie (2015)
 Bed of Roses (2008–2011)
 Bellbird (1967–1977)
 Ben Hall (1975)
 Blue Murder (1995)
 Brides of Christ (1991, later moved to Ten)
 The Broken Shore (2014)
 Captain James Cook (1987)
 Carlotta (2014)
 Cassidy (1989)
 Catspaw (1978)
 Certain Women (1973–1976)
 Changi (2001)
 Children's Hospital (1997–1998)
 Cleverman (2016–2017)
 Cliffy (2013)
 The Code (2014–2016)
 Come In Spinner (1990)
 Correlli (1995)
 Crownies (2011)
 The Cry (2019) (co-production with BBC)
 Curtin (2007)
 The Cut (2009)
 The Damnation of Harvey McHugh (1994)
 Dancing Daze (1986)
 Dangerous Remedy (2012)
 Devil's Dust (2012)
 Diary of an Uber Driver (2019)
 Dirt Game (2009)
 The Doctor Blake Mysteries (2013–2017, moved to Seven Network)
 East of Everything (2008–2009)
 Edens Lost (1989)
 Embassy (1990–1992)
 The Eternity Man (2009) (co-production with Channel 4)
 Fallen Angels (1997)
 The Farm (2001)
 Fireflies (2004)
 The Gods of Wheat Street (2014)
 Golden Soak (1979)
 G.P. (1989–1996)
 Grass Roots (2000–2003)
 Head Start (2001)
 Heartland (1994)
 Hell Has Harbour Views (2005)
 Here Out West (2022)
 Hiding (2015)
 House Rules (1988)
 The Hungry Ones (1963)
 I Can Jump Puddles (1981)
 Janet King (2014–2017)
 Janus (1994–1995)
 Kirby's Company (1977)
 The Last Resort (1988–1989)
 The Leaving of Liverpool (1992) (co-production with BBC)
 Les Norton (2019)
 Lessons From The Grave (2013–2014)
 Love is a Four Letter Word (2001)
 Mabo (2012)
 Marking Time (2003)
 Marriage Acts (2001)
 MDA (2002–2005)
 Menzies and Churchill at War (2008)
 Mercury (1996)
 Miss Fisher's Murder Mysteries (2012–2015)
 My Brother Jack (1965, 2001 series later went to air on Ten)
 Newton's Law (2017)
 Old School (2014)
 The Oracle (1979)
 The Outcasts (1961)
 The Outsiders (1976–1977)
 Paper Giants: The Birth of Cleo (2011)
 Paper Giants: Magazine Wars (2013)
 The Patriots (1962)
 Patrol Boat (1979–1983, later moved to Ten)
 Phoenix (1992–1993)
 Pig in a Poke (1977)
 Pine Gap (2018) (co-production with Netflix)
 Police Rescue (1989–1996)
 Power Without Glory (1976)
 The Prime Minister is Missing (2008)
 Pulse (2017)
 The Purple Jacaranda (1964)
 Rain Shadow (2007)
 Rake (2010–2018)
 Raw FM (1997–1998)
 Redfern Now (2012–2015)
 Ride on Stranger (1979)
 Riot (2018)
 The River Kings (1991)
 The Road from Coorain (2002)
 Robbery Under Arms (1985)
 Rush (1974–1976)
 Scales of Justice (1983)
 SeaChange (1998–2000)
 Secret Bridesmaids' Business (2002)
 The Secret River (2015)
 Serangoon Road (2013) (co-production with HBO Asia)
 Serpent in the Rainbow (1973)
 Seven Deadly Sins (1993)
 Seven Types of Ambiguity (2017)
 The Shark Net (2003)
 Shark's Paradise (1986)
 The Silence (2006)
 Silly Season Cinema (1982)
 Sisters of War (2010)
 The Slap (2011)
 Something in the Air (2000–2002)
 Stark (1993) (co-production with BBC)
 Stateless (2020)
 Stormy Petrel (1960)
 The Straits (2012)
 Studio 86 (1986)
 Sweet and Sour (1984)
 The Sweet Sad Story of Elmo and Me (1965)
 A Taste for Blue Ribbons (1973)
 The Time of Our Lives (2013–2014)
 The Timeless Land (1980)
 Top Mates (1979)
 The Truckies (1978)
 Vacancy in Vaughn Street (1963)
 Valentine's Day (2008)
 The Valley Between (1996)
 Wildside (1997–1999)
 The Willow Bend Mystery (1983)

Comedy / Entertainment

 8MMM Aboriginal Radio (2015)
 Aaron Chen Tonight (2017 on ABC2)
 Adam Hills Tonight (2011–2013)
 The Adventures of Lano and Woodley (1997–1999)
 The Agony Of... (2012–2015)
 Alvin Purple (1976)
 American College Football (1991–1996)
 A Moody Christmas (2012)
 Angry Boys (2011) (co-production with HBO)
 The Annette Klooger Show (1959–1961)
 At Home with Julia (2011)
 Audrey's Kitchen (2012–2013)
 The Aunty Jack Show (1972–1973)
 Australia You're Standing In It (1983–1984)
 BackBerner (1999–2002)
 Back Seat Drivers (2014 on ABC2)
 Bad Cop, Bad Cop (2003–2003)
 Ballzup! (1994)
 Beached Az (2009–2010)
 Beginners, Please (1961)
 Bentley's Bandbox (1960)
 Between Ourselves (1963)
 Blah Blah Blah (1988)
 The Big Gig (1989–1991)
 The Bryan Davies Show (1962–1963)
 Cafe Continental (1958–1961)
 The Chaser Decides (2004, 2007)
 Chaser News Alert (2005 on ABC2)
 The Chaser's Election Desk (2016)
 The Chaser's Media Circus (2014–2015)
 The Chaser's War on Everything (2006–2009)
 The Checkout (2013–2018)
 Clarke & Dawe (2000–2017)
 Club Buggery (1995–1997)
 CNNNN (2002–2003)
 Comedy Showroom (2016)
 Comedy Up Late (2013–2018 on ABC Comedy)
 Corridors of Power (2001)
 Couchman (1989–1992)
 Country Style (1958)
 DAAS Kapital (1991–1992)
 Da Kath & Kim Code (2005)
 Dearest Enemy (1989)
 The D Generation (1986–1987, moved to Seven 1988–1989)
 The Dingo Principle (1987)
 Dirty Laundry Live (2013–2014 on ABC2, 2015 on ABC)
 The Divorce (2015)
 Dog's Head Bay (1999)
 Double the Fist (2004, 2008)
 Eagle & Evans (2004)
 The Edge of The Bush (2017)
 The Einstein Factor (2004–2009)
 Eggshells (1991–1993)
 The Election Chaser (2001)
 The Elegant Gentleman's Guide to Knife Fighting (2013)
 Enough Rope with Andrew Denton (2003–2008)
 The Evie Hayes Show (1960)
 The Ex-PM (2015, 2017)
 Family Bowl Quiz (1969)
 Fancy Boy (2016 on ABC2)
 The Fast Lane (1985, 1987)
 The Fat (2000–2003)
 Fiesta (1958)
 Find the Link (1957–1958)
 Flashback (1993, 2000)
 Flipside (2002)
 Frontline (1994–1997)
 Funky Squad (1995)
 The Games (1998–2000)
 The Garry McDonald Show (1977)
 The Gerry Connolly Show (1988)
 Get Krack!n (2017–2019)
 Gillies and Company (1992)
 The Gillies Report (1984–1985)
 The Gillies Republic (1986)
 The Glass House (2001–2006)
 Good News Week (1996–1998, moved to Ten 1998–2000, 2008–2012)
 Good News Weekend (1998)
 Growing Up Gracefully (2017)
 Hack Live (2015–2017 on ABC2)
 Hal Lashwood's Alabama Jubilee (1958–1961)
 The Hamster Decides (2013)
 The Hamster Wheel (2011–2012)
 Head 2 Head (2006)
 Here Come the Girls (1960)
 The Hollowmen (2008)
 Home Sweet Home (1980–1982)
 Homeward Bound (1958)
 The House with Annabel Crabb (2017)
 House Rules (1988)
 How Not to Behave (2015)
 I Rock (2010 on ABC2)
 In Harmer's Way (1990–1992)
 The Inventors (1970–1982)
 It's A Date (2013–2014)
 Ja'mie: Private School Girl (2013) (co-production with HBO)
 The Johnny Gredula Show (1957–1958)
 John Conway Tonight (2017 on ABC2)
 John Hinde Presents (1989–1999)
 John Safran's Race Relations (2009)
 Jonah from Tonga (2014)
 Judith Lucy Is All Woman (2015)
 Judith Lucy's Spiritual Journey (2011)
 The Katering Show (2016)
 Kath & Kim (2002–2005 on ABC, 2007 on Seven)
 Kittson Fahey (1992–1993)
 Laid (2011–2012)
 The Late Show (1992–1993)
 Lawrence Leung's Choose Your Own Adventure (2009)
 Lawrence Leung's Unbelievable (2011)
 The Letdown (2016–2017)
 The Librarians (2007–2010)
 Live and Sweaty (1991–1995)
 The Lorrae Desmond Show (1960–1964)
 Lowdown (2010–2012)
 Luke Warm Sex (2016)
 Mastermind (1978–1984)
 Maximum Choppage (2015 on ABC2)
 The Memphis Trousers Half Hour (2005)
 Men at the Top (1959)
 The Micallef P(r)ogram(me) (1998–2001)
 The Mix (2014–2021)
 The Moodys (2014)
 The Money or the Gun (1989–1990)
 Myf Warhurst's Nice (2012)
 The NYE Pub Quiz (2014–2016)
 News Free Zone (1985)
 The Norman Gunston Show (1975–1976 on ABC, moved to Seven 1978–1979, 1981 and 1993)
 O'Loghlin on Saturday Night (1999)
 One Size Fits All (2000)
 Outland (2012)
 The Oz Game (1988–1989)
 Quest (1976–1978)
 Problems (2012)
 Randling (2012)
 Reality Check (2014)
 Review with Myles Barlow (2008–2010 on ABC2)
 The Roast (2012–2014 on ABC2)
 Ronny Chieng: International Student (2017)
 Rosehaven (2016–2021)
 Rubbery Figures (1987–1990)
 Sammy J & Randy in Ricketts Lane (2015)
 Sammy J's Playground Politics (2016 on iView)
 Sando (2018)
 The Saturday Show (1959)
 Shaun Micallef's Mad as Hell (2012–2022)
 Seeing Stars (1957–1959)
 Shock, Horror, Aunty! (2013)
 Short Cuts to Glory: Matt Okine (2017)
 Sideliners (2017)
 The Sideshow (2007)
 The Simon Gallagher Show (1982–1983)
 Sleuth 101 (2010)
 Soul Mates (2014 on ABC2)
 Sport in Question (1986)
 Squinters (2018)
 Story Club (2015 on ABC2)
 The Strange Calls (2012 on ABC2)
 Strictly Dancing (2004–2005)
 Summer Heights High (2007)
 Superwog (2018 on ABC Comedy)
 Theatre Sports (1987)
 Think Tank (2018)
 This is Littleton (2014 on ABC2)
 Timothy (2014)
 Tonightly with Tom Ballard (2017–2018 on ABC Comedy)
 Tractor Monkeys (2013)
 The Trophy Room (2010)
 Twentysomething (2011–2013)
 Two's Company (1959–1961)
 Upper Middle Bogan (2013–2016)
 The Urban Monkey with Murray Foote (2009)
 Variety View (1958–1959)
 Very Small Business / Back in Very Small Business (2008, 2018)
 Vikki (1963)
 The Warriors (2017)
 We Can Be Heroes: Finding The Australian of the Year (2005)
 Wednesday Night Fever (2013)
 Welcher & Welcher (2003)
 Wham Bam Thank You Ma'am (2016 on ABC2)
 What Next (1958–1959)
 Whovians (2017–2020 on ABC2)
 Wollongong the Brave (1975)
 Woodley (2012)
 Would You Believe? (1970–1974)
 Yes We Canberra! (2010)

Factual / documentary

 #7DaysLater (2013 on ABC2)
 8 Nights Out West (2022)
 A Big Country (1968–1991)
 A League of Her Own (2022)
 A River Somewhere (1997–1998)
 Any Questions (1958–1960)
 Art Nation (2010–2011)
 Artscape (2011)
 The Arts Show (1999–2000)
 At The Movies (2004–2014)
 Auction Room (2012)
 Australian Wildlife (1963)
 Australians at War (2001)
 Backchat (1986–1994)
 Beat The Chef (2005)
 Big Ideas (2010–2014)
 Bodybeat (1993)
 The Book Club (2006–2017)
 Bullied (2017–present)
 Bush Mechanics (2001)
 Bush Tucker Man (1988, 1990, 1996)
 Can We Help? (2006–2011)
 Canberra Confidential (2013)
 Carbon: The Unauthorised Biography (2022)
 Choir of Hard Knocks (2007)
 Collectors (2005–2011)
 Come and Get It (1983–1992)
 Come In on This (1959)
 Consuming Passions (1992–2002)
 The Cook and the Chef (2006–2009)
 Country Town Rescue (2012)
 The Critics (1959–1962)
 Croc College (2013)
 David Stratton's Stories of Australian Cinema (2017)
 Dream Gardens (2017)
 The Dreamhouse (2014)
 Dumb, Drunk & Racist (2012 on ABC2)
 Dynasties (2006)
 Elders with Andrew Denton (2008–2009)
 The Exhibitionists (2022)
 Exhumed (2013)
 Exposed: The Case of Keli Lane (2018)
 Exposed: The Ghost Train Fire (2021)
 Faces of Change (1982)
 Family Confidential (2012–2015)
 The Family Court Murders (2022)
 Family Footsteps (2006–2008)
 Feedback (2002–2006)
 First Footprints (2013)
 The Floating Brothel (2006)
 For Love or Money (1987–1989)
 Frank Hurley: The Man Who Made History (2005)
 Going Country (2021)
 The Good Food Show (1989)
 Good Game (2006–2007 on ABC, 2008–2016 on ABC2)
 Great Southern Land (2012)
 The Hack Half Hour (2008–2009 on ABC2)
 Hanging with Hoges (2014)
 Hannah Gadsby's Oz (2014)
 Harley & Katya (2022)
 Hatch, Match & Dispatch (2016–present)
 Hazards, Disasters and Survival (1998)
 Head First (2013–2014 on ABC2)
 Health (1959)
 Hello Birdy (2014)
 Housemates (2017 on ABC2)
 How the Quest Was Won (2004–2005)
 Hungry Beast (2009–2011)
 Howard on Menzies: The Making of Modern Australia (2016)
 The Howard Years (2008)
 I, Spry (2010)
 In the Wild (1976–1981)
 Ithaka: A Fight to Free Julian Assange (2022)
 Jillaroo School (2015)
 Kate Ceberano and Friends (1994)
 The Killing Season (2015)
 Labor in Power (1993)
 Life at... (2006, 2008, 2010, 2012)
 Long Way to the Top (2001)
 Love Is In The Air (2003)
 Juanita: A Family Mystery (2021)
 Mainly for Women (1961–1964)
 Making Australia Happy (2010)
 Making Couples Happy (2013)
 The Making of Modern Australia (2010)
 The Matt Flinders Show (1972)
 Matt Flinders and Friends (1973)
 Meet the Mavericks (2016–2017)
 Melbourne Composers (1961–1962)
 Melbourne Magazine (1957)
 Miriam Margolyes: Almost Australian (2020)
 Miriam Margolyes: Australia Unmasked (2022)
 My Favourite Album (2006)
 My Favourite Australian (2008)
 My Favourite Book (2004)
 My Favourite Film (2005)
 Naturally Australia (1996–2001)
 Nature Notebook (1958)
 Navy Divers (2008)
 The New Inventors (2004–2011)
 Next Stop Hollywood (2013)
 New Look at New Guinea (1959)
 Not Quite Art (2007 on ABC1, 2008 on ABC2)
 On the Road
 Open Learning (1992–2001)
 Operatunity Oz (2006)
 Outback ER (2015)
 Outback House (2005)
 Outback Kids (2011)
 Palazzo di Cozzo: The Australian Dream. Italian Style. (2022)
 Parental Guidance Recommended (1987–1992)
 Peking to Paris (2006)
 Picture Page (1956–1957)
 Plumpton High Babies (2003)
 Poh's Kitchen (2010–2012)
 Photo Finish (2012)
 Quantum (1985–2001)
 Race Around Oz (2000)
 Race Around the World (1997–1998)
 Race Around the Corner
 ReDesign My Brain (2013, 2015)
 Restoration Australia (2015)
 Revealing Gallipoli (2005)
 S'Cool Sport (1996–1997)
 Savage Indictment (1990)
 Science Today (1958)
 Screen Time (2017)
 Second Opinion (2005)
 Shitsville Express (2013 on ABC2)
 Silvia's Italian Table (2016)
 Sleek Geeks (2008–2010)
 Space 22 (2022)
 Step into Paradise (2021)
 Stop Laughing...This Is Serious (2015–2017)
 Streets of Your Town (2016)
 South Side Story (2007)
 Sporting Nation (2012)
 Sow What (1967–1988)
 Stress Buster (2008)
 Strictly Speaking (2010–2011)
 Stuff (2008)
 Sunday Arts (2006–2009)
 Surfing the Menu (2003–2006)
 Surfing the Menu: The Next Generation (2016)
 Sydney Grows Up (1958)
 Sylvania Waters (1992)
 Talking Heads (2005–2010)
 Tall Poppy: A Skater's Story (2021)
 Tattoo Tales (2015 on ABC2)
 Todd Sampson's Life on the Line (2017)
 Tomorrow's World (1959)
 Tonic (2011–2012)
 Towards 2000 (1981–1983)
 The Track (2000)
 I'm Wanita (2022)
 The War That Changed Us (2014)
 The Way We Were (2004)
 The Years That Made Us (2013)
 Two in the Top End (2008)
 TVTV (1993–1995)
 University Challenge Australia (1987–1989)
 Untold Stories (2014)
 The Vision Splendid (1977)
 Vulture (2005)
 Who Killed Dr Bogle and Mrs Chandler? (2006)
 Who's Been Sleeping in My House? (2011–2013)
 Wildlife Australia
 Women's World (1956–1963)

Sport

 Basketball: NBL (1979–2001, 2017–2018)
 Soccer: Socceroos Internationals
 Soccer: Matildas Internationals
 Soccer: W-League (2008–2017, 2019–2021), A-League (2019–2021)

Music

 The 10:30 Slot (1999–2000)
 Antenna (1984–1985)
 Australian All Star Jazz Band (1959)
 Beatbox (1985–1988)
 Between the Teeth (1986–1987)
 Billabong Band (1957)
 Commonwealth Jazz Club (1965)
 Countdown (1974–1987)
 Countdown Flipside (1983)
 Countdown Friday (1982)
 Countdown Revolution (1989–1990)
 The Factory (1987–1989)
 Fancy Free (1961)
 Flashez (1976–1977)
 Funky Road (1976)
 GTK (1969–1974)
 Hit Scene (1969–1972)
 Jazz Meets Folk (1964)
 Let's Go Square Dancing (1960)
 Look Who's Dropped In (1957–1958)
 Loud (1994)
 Make Ours Music (1958–1961)
 Matt Flinders and Friends (1972–1973)
 The Meldrum Tapes (1986–1987)
 Melody Time (1957, 1959)
 Recovery (1996–2000)
 Rock Arena (1982–1989)
 Saturday Morning Fly (2002–2003)
 Shirley Abicair in Australia (1960)
 Six O'Clock Rock (1959–1962)
 Stampede (1994)
 Studio 22 (1999–2003)
 Sweet and Low (1959)
 Take 5 (1983–1984)
 Teen Scene (1964–1965)
 triple j tv (2006–2009 on ABC1 & ABC2)
 Valerie Cooney Sings (1958)
 Vic Sabrino Sings (1958)
 Videodisc (1980–1982)

Other

 Blackout (1989-1995), was produced by the newly established (1988) Aboriginal Programming Unit
 Message Stick (1999–2012) and presented by Aboriginal dancers Lillian Crombie and Malcolm Cole for Aboriginal and Torres Strait Islander audiences.

ABC ME

 A Very Barry Christmas (2008)
 Active Kidz (2004)
 Additional Fables (1992)
 Adventure Island (1967–1972)
 The Adventures of Blinky Bill (1993)
 The Adventures of Bottle Top Bill and His Best Friend Corky (2005–2009)
 The Adventures of Long John Silver (1958)
 The Adventures of Sam (1999)
 The Afternoon Show (1987–1993)
 Alexander's Afternoon (1980)
 Alexander's Antics (1980)
 The Alexander Bunyip Show (1981)
 Alexander Bunyip's Billabong (1978–1988)
 Alpha Scorpio (1974)
 Andra (1976)
 Arthur! and the Square Knights of the Round Table (1966–1968)
 Aussie Kids
 The Australian Wildlife Club Bulletin (1985–1986)
 ARVO (1979)
 Baby Antonio's Circus
 Backyard Science (2013–2015)
 Bananas in Pyjamas (1992–2001, 2011–2013)
 Bang Goes the Budgie (1985)
 The Beeps (2007–2008)
 Big Square Eye (1991–1992)
 Bindi the Jungle Girl (2007–2008)
 Bindi's Bootcamp (2012–2015 on ABC3)
 Blinky Bill's Around the World Adventures (2004, originally aired on Seven)
 Blinky Bill's Extraordinary Excursion (1995)
 Blue Water High (2005–2008)
 Boffins (1995, was only released on video but did air in a number of countries)
 Bunyip (1989)
 Butterfly Island (1985–1986, Season 1 only, the rest of the series aired on Seven Network from 1987 to 1993)
 C/o The Bartons (1988)
 Camera Script (1987)
 Captain Cookaburra's Australiha (1984–1988)
 Captain Cookaburra's Road to Discovery (1985–1986)
 CJ The DJ (2009–2010 originally aired on ABC3)
 Clowning Around (1991, originally aired on Seven)
 Clowning Around 2 (1993, originally aired on Seven)
 Come Midnight Monday (1982)
 Conspiracy 365
 Coral Island (1983)
 Couch Potato (1991–2001)
 Count Us In (1999–2000)
 Countdown to 3 (2009)
 Creature Features (2002–2008)
 Dance Academy (2010–2013 on ABC3)
 Dancing Down Under
 Dead Gorgeous (2010)
 Dirtgirlworld (2009–2011)
 Dorothy the Dinosaur (2007–2010)
 Earthwatch (1979–1989)
 Earthwatch Club (1983–1984)
 EC Plays Lift Off (1994)
 Elly & Jools (1990, only airs on ABC Kids, originally aired on Nine)
 Escape from Jupiter (1994)
 Eugenie Sandler P.I. (2000)
 Fame and Misfortune (1986)
 Fatty and George (1981)
 Fat Tulips backyard (1987)
 Feathers, Fur or Fins (1986–1991)
 The Ferals (1994–1995)
 Feral TV (1996–1997)
 Ferry Boat Fred (1992)
 ‘’Fireman Sam’’1987–2007
 Finders Keepers (1991–1992)
 Five Minutes More
 Fix & Foxi and Friends
 The Flamin' Thongs (2014 on ABC3)
 For the Juniors
 Frank and Francesca (1973)
 The Genie from Down Under (1996–1998)
 Giggle and Hoot (2009–2020 on ABC Kids)
 Go Health (1978–1987, originally aired on Nine)
 Golden Pennies (1985–1986)
 Grandpa Honeyant Storytime
 Guess How Much I Love You
 Happy Hatchday to Plasmo (1989)
 The Haunted School (1986)
 Happy baby the adventures of corn and peg (2022–present)
 Home (1983)
 Hoota and Snoz (2002)
 Hunter (1984–1985)
 The Inbestigators (2019)
 Infinity Limited (1983–1984)
 Jemima's Big Adventure
 Joey's Big Adventure
 Johnson and Friends (1990–1995)
 Junior Sports Magazine (1962–1965)
 The Justin Clarke Show
 Kaboodle (1987–1990, was later aired on Seven Network from 1990 to 1993, sometimes airs again on ABC from 1990 to 1992, aired on ABC again in 1994, aired on ABC Kids for a last broadcast in 2002)
 Kideo (1993–1994)
 Kindergarten Playtime (1957–1966)
 The Kingdom of Paramithi (2008, originally aired on Nine)
 Kitu and Woofl (1997)
 The Koala Brothers
 Lab Rats Challenge
 Lachy!
 Little Lunch (2015 ABC Me)
 Lights, Camera, Action, Wiggles! (2002–2007)
 Lift Off (1992–1995)
 Li'l Elvis and the Truckstoppers (1998)
 Lizzie's Library (1995)
 The Maestro's Company (1985–1986, originally aired on SBS)
 The Magic Boomerang (1965–1966)
 Magic Mountain (1997–1998)
 The Magic Pudding (2000)
 Mal.com (2011 on ABC3)
 Maurice's Big Adventure
 Minty (1998)
 Mixy (1998–2002)
 Mr. Squiggle (1959–1999)
 My Great Big Adventure (2012 on ABC3)
 My Place (2009–2011 on ABC3)
 The Nargun and the Stars (1981)
 The New Adventures of Blinky Bill (1984–1987)
 The New Adventures of Figaro Pho
 News To Me (2016–2018 ABC Me)
 Nowhere Boys (2013–2018 on ABC Me)
 Noah and Saskia (2004)
 Ocean Girl (1994–1997, originally aired on Network Ten)
 Oswald
 Out There (1985 series)
 Out There (2003–2004)
 Pals (1987)
 Petals (1998–1999)
 Phoenix Five (1970)
 Plasmo (1997)
 Prank Patrol (2009–2013 on ABC3)
 Prank Patrol Road Trip
 Ready for This (2015 on ABC3)
 Return to Jupiter (1997)
 RollerCoaster (2005–2010)
 Round the Twist (1990–2001, Season 1 originally aired on Seven)
 The Saddle Club (2001–2003 on ABC, 2009 on Nine)
 Seven Little Australians (1973)
 Silversun (2004)
 Secret Valley (1984–1990)
 Ship to Shore (1992–1996)
 The Sleepover Club
 Splatalot
 Start from Scratch (1989)
 Steam Punks! (2013 on ABC3)
 Stop at this Station (1988–1990)
 The Stranger (1964–1965)
 Studio 3 (2009–2016 on ABC3)
 Sugar and Spice (1988–1989)
 The Sun on the Stubble (1996)
 Swap Shop (1988–1989)
 Swinging (1997)
 The Toothbrush Family (1977, season 1 only, originally aired on Nine Network)
 Touch the Sun (1988)
 Tracey McBean (2002–2006)
 Vidiot (1992–1995)
 Visions of Democracy (1998)
 WAC: World Animal Championships
 Wacky World Beaters
 Watch This Space (1982)
 Wayzgoose (1978)
 The Wayne Manifesto (1997)
 What Do You Know? (2010 on ABC3)
 What's the Big Idea?
 Wiggle and Learn (2008)
 Wiggle Town (2016)
 Wiggly Waffle (2009)
 The Winners (1985)
 Winston Steinburger and Sir Dudley Ding Dong (2016–2017)
 Worst Year of My Life Again (2014 on ABC3)
 Yakkity Yak (2002–2003, also aired on Nickelodeon Australia)
 My Year 12 Life (2017 on ABC Me and ABC)
 You're Skitting Me (2012–2016 on ABC Me)
 Zigby (2009–2015)

Foreign

0–9

 100 Things to Do Before High School
 1, 2, 3, Go!
 11 Somerset
 1990
 2 Point 4 Children
 2030 CE
 3-2-1 Contact
 30 Rock
 6teen
 64 Zoo Lane
 The 99
 3000 Whys of Blue Cat

A

 A–Z of Belief
 Aaahh!!! Real Monsters
 The Abbey
 The Abbott and Costello Cartoon Show (originally aired on Seven and Ten)
 Abel's Island
 Absolute Genius with Dick and Dom
 Ace Lightning
 The Acme School of Stuff
 Across the Roof of the World
 An Actor's Life for Me
 The Admiral and the Princess
 The Adventurer
 Adventures in Rainbow Country (later moved to Nine)
 The Adventures of Abney & Teal
 The Adventures of Dawdle the Donkey
 The Adventures of Gulliver (later moved to Seven)
 The Adventures of Huckleberry Finn
 The Adventures of Hutch the Honeybee
 The Adventures of Portland Bill
 Adventures of the Sea Hawk
 The Adventures of Sir Prancelot
 Adventures of Sonic the Hedgehog
 The Adventures of Teddy Ruxpin
 The Adventures of Tintin
 The Adventures of Tugboat Annie
 Adventure Time (shared with 9Go!)
 Agony
 AEIOU
 The Aeronauts
 After Henry
 After the War
 Agatha Christie's Marple
 Agent Z and the Penguin from Mars
 Airline
 Albert Says... Nature Knows Best
 Albert the Fifth Musketeer
 Albie
 Alexander and the Terrible, Horrible, No Good, Very Bad Day
 Alexander, Who Used to Be Rich Last Sunday
 Alexei Sayle's Stuff
 Alfonso Bonzo
 Alias the Jester
 Alien Empire
 Aliens in the Family
 All at No 20
 All Creatures Great and Small
 The All Electric Amusement Arcade
 All for Love
 All in Good Faith
 The All New Alexei Sayle Show
 All Passion Spent
 Almost Never
 Alvin and the Chipmunks (Murakami Wolf Swenson/DIC Entertainment version)
 The Alvin Show (later moved to Ten as "Channel 0" and Seven)
 The Amazing Adrenalini Brothers
 The Amazing Adventures of Morph
 The Amazing Bone
 Amazing Extraordinary Friends
 The Amazing Live Sea Monkeys
 American Cinema
 American Visions
 An Actor's Life for Me
 Andy Pandy
 Andy Robson
 The Andy Williams Show
 Andy's Aquatic Adventures
 Andy's Baby Animals
 Andy's Prehistoric Adventures
 Andy's Secret Hideout
 Andy's Wild Adventures
 Angela Anaconda
 Angelina Ballerina (later moved to Ten)
 Angelina Ballerina: The Next Steps (later moved to Ten)
 Angelmouse
 The Angry Beavers
 Animal Ark
 Animal Crackers
 Animal Fair
 Animal Farm (later moved to SBS)
 Animal Hospital
 Animal Life
 Animal Magic
 Animal Mechanicals
 Animal School
 Animal Shelf
 Animal Stories
 Animals in Action
 The Animals of Farthing Wood
 Animated Classic Showcase
 Animorphs
 The Ann Sothern Show
 Anna and the King
 Anna of the Five Towns
 Anne of Green Gables: The Animated Series
 Annedroids
 Annika
 Anno Domini
 Antarctic Man
 Anthony
 Anthony Ant
 Antonio Carluccio's Italian Feast
 Anytime Tales
 The Aphrodite Inheritance
 Appuntamento in Italia
 The Aquabats! Super Show!
 Aquila
 Arabia
 The Arcade Show
 Archer's Goon
 Archibald the Koala
 Are All Schools Like Mine
 Are You Afraid of the Dark?
 Are You Being Served? (later moved to Seven)
 Armchair Thriller (later moved to Ten)
 Around the World in 80 Days
 Around the World with Willy Fog
 Arrested Development
 Art Attack
 The Art of the Motion Picture
 Art Ninja
 Art's Place
 The Arthur Haynes Show
 As Time Goes By
 The Ascent of Man
 Ashenden
 Ashes to Ashes
 Asia Pacific Focus
 Aspel and Company
 The Assassination Run
 Asterix the Gaul
 Astro Boy (1980s)
 Astro Boy (2003 series)
 Atlantis High
 Atletico Partick
 Atom Ant (later moved to Seven)
 Atomic Betty
 Atomic Puppet
 Attenborough and Animals
 Aubrey
 An Actor's Life for Me
 An Audience with Billy Connolly (later moved to Seven)
 An Audience with Peter Ustinov
 Audrey and Friends
 Auf Wiedersehen, Pet
 Australian Ecology
 The Australian Experience
 Australian Eye
 Australian Impact
 Australian Studies
 Australians
 Automania
 Avatar: The Last Airbender (later moved to Ten)
 Avec Plaisir
 Avenger Penguins (later moved to 7TWO)
 The Avengers (later moved to Nine)
 The Avengers: Earth's Mightiest Heroes
 Avventura

B

 Babar
 Babar and the Adventures of Badou
 The Backyardigans
 Bali
 Bambaloo
 The Bamboo Bears
 Barney's Barrier Reef
 The Basil Brush Show
 Baby and Co.
 The Baby-Sitters Club
 Bad Boyes
 Bad Cop, Bad Cop
 Badger on the Barge
 Badger
 Badjelly the Witch
 Bagpuss
 Ballykissangel
 Bambinger
 The Bamboo Brush
 Bamse – The World's Strongest Bear!
 The Banana Splits (later moved to Southern Cross)
 Bananaman
 Bangers and Mash
 Barbapapa
 Barbara's World of Horses and Ponies
 The Barchester Chronicles
 Barney
 Barney & Friends (only on ABC Kids in 2003, usually airs on Nine and sometimes on Ten)
 Barracuda 
 Barriers
 Basic Photography
 Basil Brush
 Basil Hears a Noise
 The Baskervilles
 Basket Fever
 Batfink (originally aired on Ten)
 Battle of the Planets (originally aired on Ten)
 BB3B
 The Beachcombers
 Beached Az
 Bear in the Big Blue House
 The Bear, the Tiger and the Others
 Beast
 Beat of the City
 Beau Geste
 The Beautiful Life
 Bed of Roses
 Beginners, Please
 Behaving Badly
 The Beiderbecke Affair
 Being Ian
 Belle and Sebastian
 The Bellflower Bunnies
 Benin: An African Kingdom
 Bentley's Bandbox
 Ben Elton: The Man from Auntie
 Ben Hall
 Ben and Holly's Little Kingdom
 Benjamin the Elephant
 The Benny Hill Show
 The Berenstain Bears (later moved to Seven)
 The Berestain Bears (2003 Series)
 Bernard
 Bert and Ernie's Great Adventures
 Bertha
 Best Ed
 Best Sports Ever!
 The Betty Hutton Show
 Between the Lines
 Between the Lions
 Between Ourselves
 Between Two Worlds
 Beyond Tomorrow
 The BFG
 The Bible Lands
 Big Babies
 Big Bag
 Big Bird in Australia
 Big Bird in China
 The Big Knights
 A Big Country
 Big Kids
 The Big Pull
 Big Ted's Big Adventure
 Big Train
 The Big World of Little Adam
 Biggles
 The Bill (later moved to 10 Bold)
 Bill and Ben
 Bill and Bunny
 Billabong Band
 Billy the Cat
 Billy the Kid
 Billy Webb's Amazing Stories
 Binka the Cat
 Bird of Prey
 Birds of a Feather
 A Bit of Fry and Laurie
 Bits and Bytes
 Bits and Bytes 2
 The Biz
 Black Cab
 Black Hearts in Battersea
 Black Hole High
 Blackadder (originally aired on Seven)
 Blackadder II (originally aired on Seven)
 Blackadder the Third (originally aired on Seven)
 Blackadder Goes Forth (originally aired on Seven)
 Blackeyes
 Blackpool
 Black Books
 Black Panther: The Animated Series
 Blanche
 Blah Blah Blah
 Blake's 7
 Blazing Dragons
 Bless This House
 Blind Justice
 Bliss (originally aired on BBC First)
 Blood and Honey
 Blood on the Carpet
 Blott on the Landscape
 Blue Wilderness
 Blue's Clues
 Bob the Builder (Original stop motion series, 2015 reboot now airs on Eleven and classic series airs on Ten)
 Bob the Builder: Project Build It (later moved to Ten)
 Bob the Builder: Ready, Steady, Build! (later moved to Ten)
 Boblins
 Bod
 The Body in Question
 Body & Soul
 Bondi
 Bonje (originally aired on SBS)
 Book Book
 Book Bug
 Book Dramatisations
 The Book Group
 Bookie
 Bootleg
 Bootsie and Snudge
 Border Cafe
 Born and Bred
 The Borrowers
 The Boss
 Broadchurch
 Botanic Man
 Bouli
 Bounty Hamster
 Boy Dominic
 A Boy, a Duck and a Frog
 The Boy Merlin
 Boyd Q.C.
 Boys from the Blackstuff
 Brambly Hedge (originally aired on Nine)
 Bread
 Breaking Bad
 Break in the Sun
 Brewster the Rooster
 Brian Cox's Adventures in Time and Space
 Bright Hair
 Brittas Empire
 The Brollys
 Bromwell High
 Brothers by Choice
 Brum
 The Brunel Experience
 Brush Strokes (later moved to Ten)
 The Bryan Davies Show
 Bucky and Pepito
 Buddy
 Budgie the Little Helicopter
 Building Dreams
 Build Your Own Dreams
 Bumble
 Bump
 Bump in the Night
 A Bunch of Fives
 A Bunch of Munsch
 The Bunjee Venture
 Buongiorno Italia
 Burnside
 The Burrows Collection
 The Bush Gang
 Bush Mechanics
 Business Concepts
 Busy Buses
 The Busy World of Richard Scarry
 Butch Cassidy and the Sundance Kids (later moved to Seven)
 Buzz and Poppy
 By the Sword Divided
 Byker Grove

C

 Caillou (moved to Fox Kids)
 Call Me Mister
 Callan
 Calling the Shots
 Campaign
 The Campbells
 The Canal Children
 Canimals
 Capital
 Capital City
 Captain Fathom
 Captain Flamingo
 Captain Mack
 Captain Planet and the Planeteers
 Captain Pugwash
 Capitol Critters
 Cardiac Arrest
 Carrie's War
 Carl Squared
 Carol Burnett and Friends
 Cartoons for Big Kids
 Casanova '73
 Castaway (originally aired on Seven)
 Casper and the Angels (later moved to Seven)
 The Cat Came Back
 CatDog
 Catherine the Great
 Catie's Amazing Machines
 Catspaw
 The Cattanooga Cats
 Catweazle
 The Cavanaughs
 Cavern Deep
 ChalkZone
 Chance in a Million
 Chandler & Co
 Channel 1, 2, 3, 4, 5
 Charles and Francois
 The Charlie Brown and Snoopy Show (originally aired on Nine)
 Charlie Chalk
 Charlie Chaplin Theatre
 Charlie Needs a Cloak
 The Chaser Decides (2004, 2007)
 Chaser News Alert (2005)
 Chelmsford 123
 Children Around the World
 Children of the Dog Star
 Children of Fire Mountain
 The Children of Green Knowe
 The Children of New Forest
 Children of the North
 Children of the Stones
 A Child's Garden of Verses
 The Chinese Detective
 The Chinese Puzzle
 The Choir
 Chris Cross
 Christmas Eve on Sesame Street
 Christopher Crocodile
 The Chronicles of Narnia
 Chocky
 Chocky's Challenge
 Chocky's Children
 The Choir
 Chorlton and the Wheelies
 Chucklewood Critters
 Cinema Europe
 Circle of Faith
 Circus
 Circus Everywhere
 The Cisco Kid
 Citizen James
 Citizen Smith
 City of the Wildcats
 City Tails
 Clarence (TV movie)
 Clarence (1988 series)
 Clarissa
 Class of the Titans
 Clifford the Big Red Dog
 The Clive James Show
 Close-Up
 The Clown of God
 Cockatoos at Three Springs
 Code Geass: Lelouch of the Rebellion
 The Codebreakers
 Codename Icarus
 The Cola Conquest
 The Colbert Report
 Cold Lazarus
 Cold Warrior
 The Colonials
 Come Back, Lucy
 Come Back Mrs. Noah
 Come In on This
 Comedy Break
 Comedy Playhouse
 The Comic Strip
 The Comic Strip Presents...
 Common as Muck
 The Completely Mental Misadventures of Ed Grimley
 Computer Club
 Computers in Action
 Computer Studies
 Comrades
 Concepts in Science
 Concerto Grosso Modo
 The Concert Stages of Europe
 Connie the Cow
 Construction Site
 Consumer Power
 Contrabandits
 The Cook and the Chef
 Cooper's Half Hour
 The Cops
 Coral Island
 Corduroy
 Correlli
 A Cosmic Christmas (later moved to Ten)
 Cosmos: A Personal Voyage
 Coupling
 Countdown to War
 Count Duckula (later moved to Ten and 7TWO)
 The Count of Monte Cristo
 Count Us In
 Country Boy
 Country GP
 The Country Mouse and the City Mouse Adventures
 Countrywide
 The Cow That Fell in the Canal
 Cowboy Bebop
 Crackerjack
 Craft, Design and Technology
 Creature Comforts
 Crime, Inc.
 Criminal Justice
 The Critics
 Cro
 The Croc-Note Show
 The Crystal Maze
 Crystal Tipps and Alistair
 Cuckoo Land
 The Cuckoo Waltz
 Cubeez
 Curiosity Quest
 A Curious and Diverse Flora
 Curious George
 Curse of the Viking's Grave
 Cushion Kids (originally aired on Nine)
 Custer's Last Stand Up
 Cyberchase

D

 Dad
 Dad's Army (later moved to Ten)
 Dalziel and Pascoe
 Dance Academy
 The Dancing Princesses
 Dani's Castle
 Dani’s House
 Danedyke Mystery
 Danger Bay
 Danger: Marmalade At Work
 Danger Mouse (1981 series, later moved to 7TWO)
 Danger UXB
 Dangerfield
 The Danny Kaye Show
 Daria (MTV, 1997–2001, later moved to SBS and SBS Two)
 A Dark-Adapted Eye
 The Dark Side of the Sun
 Daring and Grace: Teen Detectives
 Dave Allen at Large
 Davey and Goliath
 David Copperfield
 The David Nixon Show
 The Day of the Triffids
 The Days and Nights of Molly Dodd
 Days of Hope
 Dead Entry
 Dead Gorgeous
 Dead Head
 The Dean Martin Show
 Death in Holy Orders
 Death Note
 The December Rose
 Degrassi: First Class
 Degrassi High
 Degrassi Junior High
 Degrassi Talks
 Delfy and His Friends
 Deltora Quest
 The Demon Headmaster
 The Demon Headmaster (2019 series)
 Dennis and Gnasher (2009 series, originally aired on Nine Network and GO!)
 Dennis the Menace (later moved to Ten)
 Des
 Des Le Debut
 Design Classics
 Destination Space
 Detentionaire
 Detention Adventure
 Devenish
 Diana
 Die Kinder
 Dink, the Little Dinosaur
 Dinnerladies
 Dino Babies
 Dirty Beasts
 Discovering Japan
 Discovering Science
 Diver Dan
 Do It 
 Doctor De Soto
 Dr. Dimensionpants
 Dr. Dog
 Doctor Dolittle
 Doctor Finlay
 Dr. Finlay's Casebook
 Doctor Jazz
 Dr Otter
 Doctor Snuggles
 Doctor Who
 Doctor Who Confidential (cutdowns)
 Doctor Who: The Movie
 Dodgem
 Dodger, Bonzo and the Rest
 The Dodo Club
 DoDo, The Kid from Outer Space
 Dog and Duck
 Dog City
 Dog Tracer
 A Dog's Life
 Dogtanian and the Three Muskehounds
 Doki
 Don and Pete
 Don Burrows
 The Donna Reed Show
 Donovan Quick
 Don't Eat the Neighbours
 Don't Eat the Pictures
 Don't Miss Wax
 Don't Wait Up
 Dougie in Disguise
 Down to Earth
 Dr. Otter
 Dragon
 Dragon Tales
 Dragon's Tongue
 Drake's Venture
 Dramarama
 Dream Stuffing
 The Dreamstone
 Dreamtime Stories
 Drummer Hoff
 The Duchess of Duke Street
 Durrell in Russia
 Dustbins

E

 The Eagle of the Ninth
 Earthfasts
 Earthworm Jim
 East of Everything
 East of the Moon
 EastEnders
 Eastern Tales
 Ebb and Flo
 Echo
 Eckhart
 The Ed Sullivan Show
 Eddie's Alphabet
 Eddy and the Bear
 Edge of Darkness
 Edge of the Cold
 Edge of the Wedge
 Edgar and Ellen
 ‘’El Dorado Dreamwork’’
 Educating Marmalade
 Edward and Mrs Simpson
 The Einstein Factor
 El Nombre
 Electric Avenue
 The Electric Company (later moved to Ten and SBS)
 Electronic Officer
 Elidor
 Ella the Elephant
 Ellen's Acres
 Elmo's World
 Emma and Grandpa
 The Enchanted Castle
 The Enchanted House
 Encounter France
 End of Empire
 Engie Benjy
 Engineering Craft Studies
 English Have a Go
 English Time
 Enid Blyton's Enchanted Lands
 Enid Blyton's Secret Series
 Encounter Italy
 The Enigma Files
 The Enormous Crocodile
 Entree Libre
 Environmental Man
 Erebus: The Aftermath
 Ernie's Incredible Illucinations
 Escape from Colditz
 Escape from Scorpion Island
 Espana Viva
 Ethelbert the Tiger
 Eureka
 Eureka!
 Eureka Street
 Everest by Balloon
 The Evie Hayes Show
 The Ex-PM 
 Executive Stress
 Expedition Adam '84
 Express
 The Eye of the Dragon
 Eye of the Storm
 Eye of the Wolf
 Eye on Nature

F

 F Troop (later moved to Ten)
 Faces of Change
 Faces of Japan
 Facing Writers
 The Facts of Life
 The Fainthearted Feminist
 The Fairytaler
 The Fall and Rise of Reginald Perrin
 Fallen Angels
 Fame is the Spur
 Families of the World
 Family
 The Family Ness
 The Famous Five (1970s)
 The Famous Five (1990s)
 The Fantastic Flying Journey
 Fantastic Max (later moved to Seven)
 Farmkids
 Farnham and Byrne
 Fast Forward
 The Fast Lane
 The Fat
 Fat Tulip Too
 Father Christmas
 Father Ted (originally aired on Nine)
 Fawlty Towers (later moved to Seven)
 The Fear
 The Feathered Serpent
 Felix the Cat (later moved to Ten and Seven)
 Ferry Boat Fred
 Fievel's American Tails
 Fifi and the Flowertots (moved to DreamWorks Channel)
 Filthy Rich & Catflap
 Fimbles
 The Final Cut
 Find the Link
 Finders Seekers
 A Fine Romance
 Fingerbobs
 Fix & Foxi and Friends
 The Fire-Raiser
 Fireman Sam (original series) (classic series airs on Ten)
 Five Children and It
 Five Minute Wonder
 Flambards
 The Flame Trees of Thika
 Flashing Pedals
 The Flaxton Boys
 The Flight of the Heron
 Flight Squad
 Flip, Side, Turn
 Flipper and Lopaka
 The Flockton Flyer
 Floorshow
 Flower Pot Men
 Flower Stories
 Floyd on Fish (originally aired on SBS)
 Fly Tales
 The Flying Kiwi
 Flying Start
 Focus on Flowers
 Foo-Foo
 The Fool of the World and the Flying Ship
 The Foolish Frog
 For The Juniors
 For One Night Only
 Forest Friends
 The Forest Rangers
 Forget Me Not Farm
 The Forgotten Toys (special later moved to Seven)
 Form 3 Maths
 Fortitude
 Fortunes of War
 Four Fathers
 The Four Sevens
 The Fourth Arm
 Fourways Farm
 The Foxbusters
 Fox Tales
 Foyle's War
 Fragile Earth
 The Fragile Heart
 Framed
 Frankie Howerd Confessions
 Frankie's House
 Franklin
 Franklin and Friends
 Franny's Feet
 Freaky
 Freaky Eaters (broadcast as Eataholics)
 Freaky Stories
 Fred Basset
 Freddie and Max
 Freddie Mercury: The Final Act
 Freefonix
 Freewheelers
 French and Saunders
 French Fields
 Fresh Fields
 Freud
 The Friday Weekley
 Friend or Foe
 Frog and Toad are Friends
 Frogets
 From Monkeys to Apes
 Frontiers
 Frootie Tooties
 The Frost Report
 Fruits Basket
 The Fruitties
 The Fugitives (TV series)
 Full House (1972 version)
 The Full Wax
 The Fully Ordained Meat Pie
 Fun Song Factory
 Funky Squad
 Funny Little Bugs
 Funny Things Happen Down Under
 Funnybones
 Fun with Claude
 The Further Adventures of SuperTed

G

 G.B.H.
 The Gadfly
 Gallowglass
  Gaspard and Lisa
 The Galton and Simpson Playhouse
 The Game of Life
 Game On
 Gardens of the World with Audrey Hepburn
 Gasp (originally aired on Nine Network)
 Gather Your Dreams
 Gefiterfish
 The Gemini Factor
 Gems
 Gerald McBoing-Boing
 Gentle Ben
 Geography Today
 George and the Christmas Star
 George and Martha
 George and Mildred
 George Shrinks
 Gerry Anderson's New Captain Scarlet
 The Get Along Gang
 The Ghost and Mrs. Muir
 Ghost Hunter
 Ghostbusters
 Ghostwriter
 The Ghosts of Motley Hall
 The Giddy Game Show
 The Gift (British TV series)
 Gimme Gimme Gimme
 The Girl from Mars
 The Girl from U.N.C.L.E.
 Girls on Top
 Give Us a Break
 Give 'em Heaps
 Glitch 
 The Glittering Prizes
 God's Wonderful Railway
 Goggle-Eyes
 Gogs
 Going Bananas
 Golden Silents
 Gold, Gold, Gold
 A Gondola on the Murray
 Goodbye, Mr Kent
 Goodnight Sweetheart
 The Goodies (later moved to Seven and Ten)
 The Good Life (later moved to Ten)
 The Good Old Days
 Gortimer Gibbon's Life On Normal Street
 The Governor
 The Governor and J.J.
 The Graham Norton Show (now on Ten)
 Grandma Bricks of Swallow Street
 Grandpa in My Pocket
 Grange Hill
 Granpa
 Grass Roots
 Grasshopper Island
 The Gravy Train
 The Gravy Train Goes East
 The Great Composers
 Great Crimes and Trials of the 20th Century
 Great Expectations
 Great Military Blunders
 The Great Railway Journeys of the World
 The Great Wall of Iron
 The Greatest American Hero (originally aired on Ten, later moved to Seven)
 Greece Today
 The Greedysaurus Gang
 Greenfingers
 Gremlins
 Grim Tales
 Grizzly Tales for Gruesome Kids
 Grojband
 The Growing Pains of Adrian Mole
 Growing Up Creepie
 The Gruen Transfer
 Gruey
 GTK
 Gulliver's Travels
 Gumby (originally aired on Seven and Nine)
 Gumtree
 Gustavus (later aired on SBS)
 Gypsy Girl

H

 Hairy Maclary
 Hal Lashwood's Alabama Jubilee
 Hallo aus Berlin
 Hammy Hamster's Adventures On the Riverbank
 The Hanging Gale
 Hannay
 Hank Zipzer
 The Happy Apple
 Happy Birthday Moon
 The Hardy Boys
 Harriet's Army
 Harry and the Bucket Full of Dinosaurs
 Harry and the Hendersons (later moved to Ten)
 Harry and the Wrinklies
 The Haunting of Cassie Palmer
 Hawaii Five-O
 Hawkmoor
 Hazell
 Heart of the Dragon
 Heartland
 Heartbeat
 The Heat of the Day
 Heathcliff
 Hedgehog Wedding
 Hedgerow House
 Heil Caesar
 The Hello Girls
 Help
 Help! I'm a Teenage Outlaw
 Henry's Cat
 Henry's Leg
 Here Come the Girls
 Here in the West
 Here's the Beat
 Here's How!
 Here's Lucy
 Hergé's Adventures of Tintin (1991 series)
 The Herlufs
 Hero to Zero
 Heroes of the Faith
 Hetty Wainthropp Investigates
 Hey Arnold!
 Hey, Landlord
 Hi-De-Hi!
 Hiding 
 High Fidelity
 The High Fructose Adventures of Annoying Orange
 Highway Thru Hell
 Hilary
 The Hill of the Red Fox
 Hill Street Blues (originally aired on Seven)
 The Hills of Heaven
 Himalaya with Michael Palin
 History Economics
 The Hitchhiker's Guide to the Galaxy (later moved to SBS)
 Hold the Back Page
 Hold the Dream
 Holiday
 Holiday Hazards
 The Hollowmen
 Hollywood: You Must Remember This
 Hollywood Legends
 Hollywood the Golden Years: The RKO Story
 Home James!
 Homer and Landau
 The Hoobs
 The Hooley Dooleys
 Hopla
 Horrible Histories (2001 series)
 Horrible Histories (2009 series)
 Horse in the House
 A Horseman Riding By
 Horses Galore
 Hothouse
 Hot Chips
 The Hot Shoe Show
 Hound for Hire
 House of Cards
 House of Elliott
 House of Rock
 How a Child Grows
 How Do You Want Me?
 How Green Was My Valley
 How Not to Behave 
 How to Marry a Millionaire
 How We Used to Live
 How You Get to the Queue!
 Howards' Way
 How's Your Father?
 Hubble Bubble
 Hugh and I
 Hugo & Rita: The Series
 Hullabaloo
 The Human Body
 Humf
 Hunter's Gold
 Huntingtower
 Hustle
 The Hydronauts
 Hyperdrive

I

 I Didn't Know You Cared
 I Dream
 I Know a Secret
 I Love Lucy
 I Married Joan
 I Spy
 Images of Nature
 In a Land of Plenty
 In Sickness and in Health
 In Transit
 In the Company of Men
 In the Footsteps of Alexander the Great
 In the Red
 In the Wild with Harry Butler
 In Your Garden
 Industry
 Infant Maths
 The Inner Power
 Insektors
 Inside Creation
 Inside Running
 Inspector Gadget (later moved to Ten)
 Inspector Gadget Saves Christmas
 Into the Labyrinth
 Into Music
 The Invisible Man
 The Irish R.M.
 Iron Man: Armored Adventures
 Island of the Skog
 It Ain't Half Hot Mum (later moved to Seven and Ten)
 It Takes a Worried Man
 Italianissimo
 It's a Date
 It's a Square World

J

 Jacek
 Jack High
 Jack the Ripper
 Jackanory Playhouse
 Jakers! The Adventures of Piggley Winks
 Jake's Progress
 Jam Sandwich
 Jamie and the Magic Torch
 Jamillah and Aladdin
 Janas
 Jandal Burn
 Jane Eyre
 Jasper the Penguin
 Jay Jay the Jet Plane
 Jazz Meets Folk
 Jellabies
 Jemima Shore Investigates
 Jeopardy
 Jibber Jabber
 The Jim Davidson Show
 Jim Henson Presents the World of Puppetry
 Jim Henson's The Storyteller (originally aired on Ten)
 Jimbo and the Jet Set
 The Jimmy Wheeler Show
 Jimmy's Den
 Jockey School
 John McNab
 The Johnny Cash Show
 The Johnny Gredula Show
 Joint Accountant
 Jonathan Creek
 Joshua Jones
 Journey into Thailand
 Journey to the Himalayas
 The Judy Garland Show
 Jumbleland
 Jungle Tales
 Junior Sports Magazine
 Junkyard Wars
 Jurassic Cubs
 Just Barbara
 Just for Laughs
 Just Good Friends (later moved to Ten)
 Just Liz
 Just William (1990s version, the 1970s version was originally aired on Seven Network)

K

 Kaeloo
 Kamisama Kiss
 Katie and Orbie
 Katy
 Kavanagh QC
 The Keepers
 Ken Hom's Chinese Cookery (originally aired on SBS)
 The Ken Noyle Show
 Kenny and Dolly
 The Kenny Everett Video Show
 Kenny the Shark
 Keeping Up Appearances
 Kessler
 Kevin and Co.
 Key to Freedom
 Kid in the Corner
 Kid vs. Kat (Also aired on Nickelodeon)
 The Kids from 47A
 The Kids of Degrassi Street 
 Kidsongs
 Kimba the White Lion
 A Kind of Loving
 King
 King and Castle
 King Arthur's Disasters
 King Cinder
 King Leonardo and His Short Subjects (later moved to Seven, Nine and Ten)
 The King of Instruments
 Kingdom 4
 The King's Outlaw
 Kinsey
 Kip and David
 Kipper
 Kirby's Company
 Kiri the Clown
 Kiss Me Kate
 Kittson Fahey
 Koki
 K-On!
 Kontakte
 The Krypton Factor
 The Kumars at No. 42

L

 La Linea
 La Strada (later moved to SBS)
 Labyrinth
 Ladies in Charge
 Laff-a-Bits
 Lagos Airport
 Laid
 The Lakes
 The Land Before Time
 Land of the Tiger
 Lanfeust Quest
 Langley Bottom
 Lapitch the Little Shoemaker
 The Large Family
 The Larkins
 Larry the Lamb
 Lassie (later moved to Ten)
 The Last Emperor
 Last of the Summer Wine
 The Last Song
 The Late Clive James
 Late Starter
 Latin Holiday 
 The Last Song
 A Laurel and Hardy Cartoon (later moved to Ten and Seven)
 Lavender Castle
 LazyTown
 Le Club
 The League of Gentlemen
 Learned Friends
 A Lease on Life
 The Leatherstocking Tales
 The Legend of King Arthur
 The Legend of Lochnagar
 The Legend of Robin Hood
 The Legend of White Fang
 The Legends of Treasure Island (later moved to 7TWO)
 Lens on Lilliput
 Leopold the Cat
 Lesley Garrett Tonight
 Let There Be Love
 Let's Go Maths
 Let's Learn Japanese
 Let's Read with Basil Brush
 Letters from Felix
 Letty
 The Librarians
 Life Force
 The Life of Birds
 The Life of Riley
 Life on Earth
 Life on Mars
 Lifeskills
 The Legend of Dick and Dom
 Life with Boys
 Lift Off
 Lincoln
 The Lion, the Witch and the Wardrobe
 Lisa
 The Little and Large Telly Show
 Little Bear
 Little Britain
 Little Charley Bear (later moved to DreamWorks)
 The Little Engine That Could
 Little Ghosts
 Little Grey Rabbit
 Little Lord Fauntleroy
 The Little Lulu Show
 The Little Match Girl
 Little Monsters
 Little Mouse on the Prairie
 Little Robots
 Little Tim and the Brave Sea Captain
 Littlest Pet Shop (1995 Series)
 The Liver Birds
 Living Australia
 Living Britain
 Living the Dream
 Living in Asia
 Living in Japan
 Living in the 90s
 The Living Landscape
 Little Ted's Big Adventure
 Living Tomorrow
 Living with the Law
 The Lizard King
 Lizzie McGuire
 Lizzie's Pictures
 The Lodge
 Lomax, the Hound of Music
 London Embassy
 The Long Chase
 Look
 Look at a Book
 Look at It This Way
 Look Up
 Look Who's Dropped In
 Lorne Greene's Last of the Wild
 Lorne Greene's New Wilderness
 Lost Belongings
 Lost in Oz
 The Lotus Eaters
 The Loud House (Now on 10 Shake)
 Love in a Cold Climate
 Love on a Branch Line
 Lovejoy
 Lower Primary Science
 Lucky Luke
 The Lucy Show
 Ludwig

M

 The Machine Gunners
 Made by Design
 Madeline
 Madison
 Madness
 Madson
 Maharajas
 Maggie and the Ferocious Beast (aired only on ABC Kids)
 Magic Adventures of Mumfie
 Make Way for Noddy
 Masha and the Bear
 The Magic Bag
 The Magic Ball
 The Magic Finger
 The Magic House
 The Magic Library
 The Magic Park
 The Magic Roundabout (original series)
 The Magic Roundabout (2007 reboot)
 The Magic School Bus (originally aired on Ten)
 The Magical World of Margaret Mahy
 The Maharajas
 Maid Marian and Her Merry Men
 Maigret (1960 series)
 Mainly for Women
 Maisie Raine
 Maisy
 Make It Pop
 Make Ours Music
 Mama Mirabelle's Home Movies
 Mamemo
 Man About the House
 The Man in Room 17
 Man on the Rim
 The Man Who Thought With His Hat
 The Manageress
 Mansfield Park
 Many Nations, One People
 Maori Legends of New Zealand
 Marcia's Music
 Maria Chapdelaine
 Marion and Geoff
 The Marriage Lines
 Martin Chuzzlewit
 Martin Morning
 The Marzipan Pig
 The Massingham Affair
 The Master of Ballantrae
 Masterworks from the World's Great Museums
 Materials We Need
 Mathematical Eye
 Mathica's Mathshop
 Maths at Work
 Maths Break
 The Maths Programme
 Matilda's Dream
 Matt and Jenny
 Max & Ruby
 The Max Headroom Show (a second show later aired on Seven)
 May to December
 Maya the Bee (2012)
 Maya the Honey Bee
 McCallum
 The Mechanical Universe
 The Media
 Meena
 Meet
 Meet the Wife
 Melody Time
 The Memphis Trousers Half Hour (2005)
 Men Behaving Badly
 Mentors
 The Merchant of Venice
 Mercury
 Merlin the Magical Puppy
 Metal Mickey
 Metalheads
 M.I. High
 Michael Bentine's Potty Time (originally aired on Seven)
 Michael Palin: Around the World in 80 Days
 Michael Palin's Hemingway Adventure
 Microbes and Men
 Microdocs
 The Middle East
 Middle English
 Midnight Patrol: Adventures in the Dream Zone
 Miffy
 Miffy and Friends
 Mighty Machines
 Mike and Angelo (season 1 only)
 The Mill on the Floss
 Minder (later moved to Seven and Ten)
 Mini Dragons
 Miriam and Alan: Lost in Scotland
 Miriam's Big Fat Adventure
 Miss BG
 Miss Jones and Son
 The Missing Children
 The Missing Postman
 Mission Reading
 Mr. Bean: The Animated Series
 Mr Benn
 Mister Ed (later moved to Seven and Nine)
 Mr. Fixit
 Mr. Men
 Mr. Palfrey of Westminster
 Mr Wakefield's Crusade
 The Mrs Bradley Mysteries
 Molang
 Molly's Gang
 Monarch of the Glen
 Money Matters
 Monkey
 Monkey Dust
 A Monkey's Tale
 The Monocled Mutineer
 Monster Maker (originally aired on Ten)
 Monty
 Monty Python's Flying Circus (later moved to Seven)
 Moody and Pegg
 Moominvalley
 The Moon Stallion
 Moondial
 Moonflight
 Moonlighting
 More Than Words
 More Winners
 The Morph Files
 Morris's Disappearing Bag
 Mortimer and Arabel
 Mortified (originally aired on Nine)
 Moses Jones
 The Most Wonderful Egg in the World
 Mot
 Mother Love
 The Mousehole Cat
 Moving
 Moving Wallpaper
 Moynihan
 Mr. Bean (later moved to Seven)
 Mr. Magoo
 Mr. Squiggle
 Muffin the Mule
 A Mug's Game
 The Muppet Musicians of Bremen (later moved to Seven)
 Murder Most Horrid
 Murder of a Moderate Man
 Murder Squad
 Murphy's Law
 Music and Dance
 Music Box
 Music Time
 Musical Triangles
 My Best Friend is an Alien
 My Family
 My Favourite Film
 My Favorite Martian (later moved to Nine)
 My Favorite Martian's Cartoon Show
 My Friend Rabbit
 My Good Friend
 MythBusters Jr.
 The Mysteries of Providence
 The Mysterious Cities of Gold (later moved to SBS and SBS Two)
 The Mysterious Tadpole
 The Mystery of Black Rose Castle

N

 Nanny
 Naruto (season 1 only)
 Nature Boy
 Nature Notebook
 Nature Watch Digest
 The Nearly Man
 Needles and Pins
 Nellie the Elephant
 Never the Twain
 The Neverending Story
 The New Adventures of Beans Baxter
 The New Adventures of Captain Planet
 The New Adventures of Flash Gordon
 The New Adventures of Huckleberry Finn
 The New Adventures of Lucky Luke
 The New Adventures of Madeline (later moved to Seven Network from 2002 to 2003)
 The New Adventures of Morph
 The New Avengers
 The New Ghostwriter Mysteries
 New Guinea: An Island Apart
 New Look at New Guinea
 The New Russia
 New Scotland Yard
 New Tricks
 New Zealand Free
 Next of Kin
 Nice Town
 Nico
 Night and Day
 Night of the Red Hunter
 Nighty Night
 The Ninja Follies
 No Job for a Lady
 No Strings
 No, Honestly
 Noah and Nelly in... SkylArk (later moved to SBS)
 Noah's Castle
 Noah's Island
 Nobody's Hero
 Noddy
 Noddy's Toyland Adventures
 Nonsense and Lullabyes
 North Square
 Northern Australian Documentaries
 Northwood
 Nostromo
 Not in Front of Children
 Not Only... But Also
 Noughts + Crosses
 Numbers Count
 The Nutty Squirrels Present (later moved to NRN and several regional television networks but only in NSW)

O

 Oakie Doke
 Oasis in Space
 Occasional Wife
 Oceans Alive
 Oggy and the Cockroaches (Seasons 1-3) (2009–2012)
 Octopussy from the 2nd Floor
 Odd Man Out
 Oddie in Paradise
 Odysseus: The Greatest Hero of Them All
 The Office (US)
 Oh, Mr. Toad
 Oh No, It's Selwyn Froggitt
 Old Bear Stories
 The Old Devils
 The Old Men at the Zoo 
 Old-Time Ballroom
 Oliver Twist
 Olivia
 Olliver's Adventures
 The Omega Factor
 The Omid Djalili Show
 One by One
 One Foot in the Grave
 The Onedin Line
 Only One Earth
 Only Fools and Horses
 On the Up
 Once Upon a Time
 Only One Earth
 Only When I Laugh
 Oobi
 Open All Hours (later moved to Seven)
 Open a Door
 Operavox: The Animated Operas
 Oranges Are Not the Only Fruit
 The Orchestra
 The Ordinary Bath
 Order in the House
 Orson and Olivia
 Oscar and Friends
 Oscar and the Great Wooferoo
 Oscar Charlie
 Oscar's Orchestra
 Oswald
 Ouran High School Host Club
 Our Asian Neighbours
 Our Backyard
 Our Hero
 Our John Willie
 Our Multicultural Society
 Our Mutual Friend
 Out 'N' About
 Out of Bounds
 Out of the Fiery Furnace
 The Owl Service
 Oxbridge Blues
 The Oz Kids

P

 P.B. Bear and Friends
 Pablo the Little Red Fox
 Paddington
 The Painter's World
 Pajanimals
 Palace of Dreams
 The Pallisers
 Panorama
 Papertrail
 The Paradise Club
 Paradise Postponed
 Park Ranger
 Parkinson
 Parks and Recreation
 Parnell and the Englishwoman
 Party Animals
 Partyland
 Passwords
 Pat & Mat
 Patchwork Pals
 The Patchwork Hero
 Pathway to Australian Science
 The Paul Daniels Magic Show
 Paulus the Woodgnome
 Peach's Gold
 Peanuts Specials
 Pearlie (originally aired on Ten)
 The Pee-Wee Herman Show
 The Peep Peep Show
 Peg + Cat
 Pele
 Pennies from Heaven
 People Like Us
 Percy the Park Keeper (originally aired on Nine)
 A Perfect Spy
 Personally Yours
 The Peter Serafinowicz Show
 The Phil Silvers Show
 Philbert Frog
 The Phoenix
 Phoenix 5
 The Phoenix and the Carpet
 Picture This
 Pie in the Sky
 Pig in the Middle
 Piggeldy and Frederick
 Piggsburg Pigs
 Pilgrim's Rest
 Pilgrims
 Pirates
 Pingu
 Pinky and Perky
 The Pinky and Perky Show
 Pinny's House
 Pinocchio
 Pins & Nettle
 Pippa the Hen
 Pippi Longstocking
 A Place in the World
 The Plague
 Planet Earth
 Planet Under Pressure
 The Planets
 Plastinots
 Play Away
 Play Films
 Play with Me Sesame
 Played in Australia
 Players to the Gallery
 Please Like Me (2013–2016)
 Plonsters
 Plotlands
 Plug It In, Switch It On
 Plums, Plots and Plans
 Pocket Dragon Adventures
 A Pocket for Corduroy
 A Pocketful of Dreams
 The Poetry Book
 Pole to Pole
 Pollyanna
 Pongwiffy
 Pop Movie
 Pororo the Little Penguin
 Porridge
 Portrait of a Marriage
 Postman Pat
 Pot Black
 Potter
 Power in the Pacific
 Powerhouse
 Powers
 Press Gang (later moved to 7TWO)
 Pressure Point
 Preston Pig
 Prezzemolo
 Pride and Prejudice (1995 series)
 Primary Media
 Prince Cinders
 Prince of Denmark
 The Princes and the Press
 The Princess and the Flying Shoemaker
 The Prince and the Pauper
 Private Lies
 Private Life of Plants
 Private Schulz
 The Prize: The Epic Quest for Oil, Money and Power
 Professor Balthazar
 Project Mc2
 Prospects
 Psychos
 Puddle Lane
 Pulaski: The TV Detective
 Puppets
 The Purple Jacaranda
 Pure Pwnage
 Puzzle Maths

Q

 Q8
 Q.T. Hush
 Quaq Quao
 Quark
 The Queen's Nose
 Queer as Folk 
 Quest of Eagles
 The Quiet Season
 Quinz Minutes
 The Quiz Kids
 Quo Vadis?

R

 R.W.
 The Raccoons
 Rag, Tag and Bobtail
 The Rag Trade
 The Raggy Dolls
 Ragtime
 Rainbow
 Rainbow Fish
 Ramona
 Randling
 The Rare Ones
 Rat-A-Tat
 Rat-a-Tat-Tat
 The Ratties
 The Ravelled Thread
 The Ray Bradbury Theatre
 Read All About It!
 Ready or Not
 The Real Charlotte
 The Real Story of...
 Really Wild Animals
 Rebecca
 The Rebellion of Young David
 The Red and the Blue
 Red Empire
 The Red Moore Show
 Redwall
 Reilly, Ace of Spies
 Relative Strangers
 Reputations
 The Return of the Antelope
 The Return of Bunjee
 The Return of the Psammead
 The Return of Shelley
 Return to the Magic Library
 Revolting Rhymes
 Rex the Runt (originally aired on SBS)
 Rick Stein's Seafood Odyssey
 Ridley Road
 The Riff Raff Element
 Rigolecole
 Rings on Their Fingers
 The Ripping Friends
 Ripping Yarns
 The Rise and Fall of King Cotton
 Ritter's Cove
 The Rivals of Sherlock Holmes
 A River Somewhere
 Rivers with Griff Rhys Jones
 The Road to War: Great Britain, Italy, Japan, USA
 Road to Now
 Road Rovers
 Roary the Racing Car (later moved to DreamWorks)
 Rob the Robot
 Rob Roy
 Robin Hood
 Robin's Nest
 Robo Story
 Rock Arena
 Rocket Power (originally aired on Ten)
 Rocko's Modern Life (now on Nickelodeon)
 Rockschool
 Rocky and Bullwinkle (originally aired on Seven, Nine and Ten)
 Rocky and the Dodos
 Rocky O'Rourke
 Rod, Jane and Freddy
 Roger and the Rottentrolls
 Roger Ramjet (originally aired on Seven and WIN-TV in Wollongong)
 Roland Rat
 Roland Rat Goes East
 Roland's Winter Wonderland
 Roland's Yuletide Binge
 The Rolf Harris Show
 Rolf's Walkabout
 Roll Over Beethoven
 Rollin' On the River
 The Roman Holidays (later moved to Seven)
 Roobarb
 Roobarb and Custard Too
 Rooftop Rendezvous
 Root Into Europe
 Rose and Maloney
 Rosemary Conley
 Rosie and Jim
 Rosie's Walk
 Rotten Ralph
 Round the Bend
 Royal Heritage
 The Royle Family
 Rubbadubbers
 Rubbery Figures
 A Rubovian Legend
 Rubbish, King of the Jumble
 Ruby Gloom
 Rudi & Trudi
 Rugrats (temporarily on Ten)
 Rumpole of the Bailey
 Running Scared
 Rupert

S

 S.W.A.L.K.
 St. Bear's Dolls Hospital (aired only on ABC Kids)
 Saban's Adventures of Oliver Twist
 Sagwa, the Chinese Siamese Cat
 Sailor
 Sally Bollywood: Super Detective (originally aired on Seven)
 Sali Mali
 Sam and the River
 Sam's Luck
 SamSam
 Sammy J & Randy in Ricketts Lane (2015)
 Sanctuary
 The Santa Claus Brothers
 Santa's First Christmas
 Santo Bugito
 Saturday Night Clive
 Saturday Party
 The Save-Ums!
 Scarf Jack
 Scene
 School's Out
 The Science Cafe
 Science Today
 Science Topics
 The Scientific Eye
 The Scold's Bridle
 Screaming
 Scruff
 The Sculptress
 Sea Dragon
 Sea Princesses
 Sea Trek
 Sea Urchins (later moved to Ten)
 Seaforth
 Seahouse
 Sealab 2020 (later moved to Seven)
 The Search for the Nile
 Search for Success
 Secombe with Music
 Secondary Media
 Second Sight
 Secret Adventures
 Secret Army
 The Secret Diary of Adrian Mole
 Secret Life of Toys
 Secret Oasis
 The Secret River 
 The Secret Show
 The Secret of the Sahara
 Secret Squirrel (later moved to Seven)
 The Secret World of Alex Mack
 The Secret World of Polly Flint
 Secrets of the Deep
 Secrets
 See How They Grow
 See How They Run
 Seeing Stars
 Seeing Things
 A Sense of Guilt
 Sensitive Skin
 Seven Deadly Sins
 Sexton Blake and the Demon God
 Shadow Raiders
 Shadows
 Shameless
 Shape, Shape, Shape
 The Shari Lewis Show
 Sharon and Elsie
 The Sharp End
 Sheeep
 Shelley
 Shine on Harvey Moon
 Shirley Abicair in Australia
 Shirley Bassey
 The Shirley Temple Show
 Shoebox Zoo
 Shoestring
 Shoobie Doo
 Shortland Street (originally aired on SBS)
 The Show with the Mouse
 Showtime
 Shrink Rap
 Side by Side
 Sidekick (later moved to Disney XD)
 The Sideshow
 Sierra
 The Silicon Factor
 Silent Witness
 Silly Season Cinema
 Silversun
 Simon and the Witch
 The Simon Gallaher Show
 Simon in the Land of Chalk Drawings
 Simsala Grimm
 Sinbad Jr. and his Magic Belt
 The Singing Detective
 The Sins
 Sir Bernard's Stately Homes
 Sir Francis Drake
 Sir Gadabout: The Worst Knight in the Land
 Sitting Ducks
 Six Australians
 The Six Wives of Henry VIII
 The Six: Titanic's Last Secret
 Skipper and Skeeto
 A Skirt Through History
 Skorpion
 Sky
 The Sky Bike
 Sleek Geeks
 Sleuth 101
 Slim Pig
 Slinger's Day
 Smack the Pony
 Small Potatoes (1999 series)
 Small Room in the House
 Small Stories
 Small World
 Smedley's Weekly
 Smiley's People
 Smith
 The Smoggies
 The Smokey Bear Show
 The Smothers Brothers Show
 Smuggler
 Snailsbury Tales
 Snailympics
 Snip and Snap
 So Haunt Me
 Soap
 Softly, Softly
 Soldiers
 Solo
 Some Mothers Do 'Ave 'Em (later moved to Seven and Ten)
 Something in the Air
 Sometime, Never
 The Sonnets of William Shakespeare
 Sons and Lovers
 Soong Sisters
 Sooty & Co.
 The Sooty Show
 Sooty's Amazing Adventures
 Sophie and Virginia
 Sorrell and Son
 Sorry!
 Soul Music
 Soupe Opera
 South of the Border
 South Side Story
 The Soviet Union
 Sow What
 Space Age
 Space Education
 Space Goofs
 Space on Earth
 Space Patrol
 Spacewatch
 Spare Parts in Performance
 Spartakus and the Sun Beneath the Sea
 Spectacular Spider-Man
 Speed Buggy
 Speed Racer (later aired on Seven and Ten, returned to air on ABC Kids in 2003 and ABC2 in 2005)
 Spider!
 The Spike Jones Show
 Spirit Bay
 Spirits of the Jaguar
 Spitfire Ace
 Spooky
 The Spooky Sisters
 Sport in Question
 Sportscene
 Spot
 Spot and His Grandparents Go to the Carnival
 Spot's Magical Christmas
 Spot's Musical Adventures
 The Spying Game
 Square One Television
 Stand Up, Nigel Barton
 Stanley Bagshaw
 Stanley's Dragon
 Star Blazers
 Star Wars: The Clone Wars
 Starhill Ponies
 Starsky & Hutch 
 State of the Planet
 Stephen Hawking's Universe
 Steptoe and Son
 Stickin' Around
 Sticky Moments
 Stingray
 The Stonecutter
 Stookie
 Storefront Lawyers
 Storm Hawks
 Story Beneath the Sands
 The Story of the Dancing Frog
 Storybreak
 Storymakers
 Storytelling
 The Strange Affair of Adelaide Harris
 The Strange Calls
 Strangers
 Strangers and Brothers
 Streets Apart
 Streetwise
 Strictly Dancing
 Strange Hill High
 Strike It Rich
 Striker
 Striving to Win
 Strumpet City
 Stuart Wagstaff's World Playhouse
 Studio 22
 Studio 86
 Stuff Handmade
 Submarine
 Sugarbunnies
 Supercar
 Supernatural: The Unseen Powers of Animals
 Supersense: Sixth Sense
 SuperTed
 The Super Hero Squad Show
 Surgical Spirit
 Survival with Johnny Cash
 Swallows and Amazons Forever!
 Sweat of the Sun
 The Sweeney
 Sweet Sixteen
 Sweet Seventeen
 The Swish of the Curtain
 Swiss Family Robinson
 Sword Art Online
 Sword of Freedom
 Sydney Grows Up
 Sykes
 Sykes and a...
 Sylvan
 Sylvanian Families

T

 T-Bag
 Take 5
 Take Kerr
 Take a Look
 Take Me Home
 Take Three
 Takin' Over the Asylum
 Taking The Next Step
 A Tale of Two Cities
 Tales from the Blue Crystal
 Tales from the Darkside
 Tales from the Edge of the World
 Tales From Fat Tulip's Garden
 Tales from Hoffnung
 Tales of India
 Tales of Magic
 Tales of the City
 Tales of the Unexpected
 Tales of the Wizard of Oz
 Tales of Wells Fargo
 Talking Animals
 Talking Eggs
 Talking Pictures
 Tall Poppies
 Target
 Taste for Adventure
 Teacher Haze
 Teacup Travels
 Tears Before Bedtime
 Ted Sieger's Wildlife
 Teddy Trucks
 Teen Scene
 Teenage Fairytale Dropouts (originally aired on Seven)
 Teenage Health Freak
 Tele-Variety
 Telebugs
 Telford's Change
 Teletubbies (original series)
 Teletubbies Everywhere
 Television Parts
 Tell Tale Hearts
 Tender Is the Night
 Tenko
 Terry and Julian
 Terry and the Gunrunners
 Terry on the Fence
 Testament: The Bible in Animation
 That '70s Show (originally aired on Seven)
 The Thick of It
 The Text Files
 Thicker than Water
 The Thin Blue Line
 The Three Robbers
 The Trial of Christine Keeler (originally aired on Foxtel)
 This Day Tonight
 This is Your World
 This Life
 This Sporting Life
 This Year's Model
 Three Little Tramps
 Three Up, Two Down
 Three's Company (later moved to Ten)
 Tightrope
 Till Death Us Do Part
 Time Riders
 Timeframe
 Tinker, Tailor, Soldier, Spy
 Tiny Planets
 Titch
 Titmuss Regained
 To Play the King
 To the Manor Born (later moved to Ten and Seven)
 To Serve Them All My Days
 Toad Patrol
 Today's Special
 ToddWorld
 Tofffsy
 Tom and Vicky
 Tom Brown's School Days
 Tom, Dick and Harriet
 Tom Grattan's War
 The Tomorrow People (1992 version)
 Tomorrow's World
 Tom's Midnight Garden
 The Tony Hancock Show
 Tooth Fairy, Where Are You?
 Tootuff
 Top Chef Junior
 Top Gear
 Top Mates
 Top of the Pops
 Top of the World
 Topo Gigio
 Torchwood
 Torchwood Declassified
 Torchy the Battery Boy
 Torque
 Total Drama (Only seasons 1–5)
 Toucan Tecs
 Total Wipeout
 Touch and Go
 A Touch of Reverence
 Towards 2000
 Towser
 Tracey Takes On...
 The Good Place
 The Tracey Ullman Show
 Tracey Ullman: A Class of Act
 Trails to Adventure
 The Trap Door
 Tree Fu Tom
 Tractor Tom
 Trapped!
 Trapp, Winkle and Box
 A Traveller in Time
 Treasure
 Treasure Island in Outer Space
 The Treasure Seekers
 Treffpunkt: Deutschland
 Trial by Marriage
 The Trials of Life
 The Tribe
 Tripper's Day
 Troublemakers
 The Troubleshooters
 Truckers
 The Truckies
 The True Believers
 True Tilda
 Tucker's Luck
 TUGS
 Tumbledown Farm
 Turtle World
 Tutenstein
 TV Channell
 TV Showboat
 Tweenies
 Twentieth Century History
 Twins of Destiny
 The Twisted Tales of Felix the Cat
 Two by Two
 The Two Ronnies (later moved to Seven)
 Tycoon
 The Tyrant King

U

 Ultraviolet
 Ulysses 31
 Unbeatable Banzuke
 Under the Mountain
 Underbelly (UK series)
 Understanding Newspapers
 Understanding Television
 Understanding Toddlers
 Understanding the Under 12s
 The Unfair Go
 United States of Tara
 Universe with Brian Cox
 University of the Air
 The Unknown Marx Brothers
 Untalkative Bunny
 The Untouchables
 The Untouchables of Elliot Mouse
 Up the Elephant and Round the Castle
 Upper Primary Arts and Crafts
 The Upside Down Show
 Upstairs, Downstairs (later moved to Nine)
 Upstairs, Downstairs Bears
 Ursula's Kiss
 Us

V

 Vampire Knight
 Vampires, Pirates & Aliens
 Van der Valk
 A Very Peculiar Practice
 Vicky the Viking
 Victor and Hugo (later moved to 7TWO)
 Victoria Wood As Seen On TV
 Vintage: A History of Wine
 Vipo: Adventures of the Flying Dog
 Vision On
 The Vision Thing
 Vital Systems
 Voltron: Defender of the Universe
 Voltron Force
 The Voyages of Doctor Dolittle

W

 The Wackers
 Waiting for God
 The War That Changed Us
 Warrior Queen
 Warship
 The Watch House
 Watch This Space
 Watch Your Language
 Waterloo Road
 Watership Down
 Watt on Earth
 The Way We Lived Now
 Wayne and Shuster
 The Ways of Seeing
 The Web
 Welcher & Welcher
 We'll Think of Something
 What-a-Mess
 Whatever Happened to the Likely Lads?
 What's in the Picture
 What's on Next?
 What's Up Doc?: A Salute to Bugs Bunny
 Wheelie and the Chopper Bunch
 The Wheels on the Bus
 When the Boat Comes In
 When the River Was the Only Road
 Where Did the Colorado Go?
 Where's Wally?
 Whistle for Willie
 The White Monkey
 White Peak Farm
 The White Seal
 The Whitehall Worrier
 Who Dares Wins
 Who Pays the Ferryman?
 Who Sir? Me Sir?
 Who Wants to Be a Princess Anyway?
 Who Will Comfort Toffle? (originally aired on SBS)
 Whodunnit?
 Whoops Baghdad
 Why Is It So?
 The Whys and Wherefores
 Widget
 Wide-Eye
 Wil Cwac Cwac
 Wild and Crazy Kids
 Wild at Heart
 Wild Relations
 The Wild Adventures of Blinky Bill (originally aired on 7TWO)
 The Wild Thornberrys
 Wild, Wild World of Animals
 Wilderness to Wisdom
 Wildernuts
 Wildwoods
 Willi Wuhlmouse
 William's Wish Wellingtons
 Willkommen!
 Willo the Wisp
 The Willow Bend Mystery
 The Wind in the Willows (later moved to 7TWO)
 Wind in the Wires
 Windfalls
 Winston Churchill: The Wilderness Years
 Wipe Out
 Wipeout
 The Wire
 The Wisdom of The Gnomes
 The Wish That Changed Christmas
 Witchcraft
 The Witch's Daughter
 Wives and Daughters
 Wodehouse Playhouse
 Wollongong the Brave
 Wolverine and the X-Men
 The Woman Who Raised a Bear as Her Son (originally aired on SBS)
 The Wombles (1973 series)
 The Wombles (1996 series)
 Women at the Top
 Women of Ninja Warrior
 Wonderbox
 The Wonder Years (originally aired on Ten)
 The Wonderful Wizard of Oz
 The Wonderful World of Puppies
 Woobinda
 Woof! (originally aired on Nine, later moved to 7TWO)
 WordGirl
 Words and Pictures
 Words Fail Me
 Worlds Beyond
 World Cultures and Youth
 The World of Beachcomber
 The World of Chemistry
 The World of David the Gnome
 The World of Eric Carle
 The World of Jim Henson
 The World of Pam Ayres
 The World of Peter Rabbit and Friends
 The World, The Flesh and the Devil
 The World We Share
 The Worst Day of My Life
 The Worst Witch
 Worzel Gummidge
 Worzel Gummidge Down Under
 Wow! Wow! Wubbzy!
 The Wubbulous World of Dr. Seuss
 Wynne and Penkovsky
 Wyrd Sisters

X
 X-DuckX

Y

 Yakari
 A Year in Provence
 Yes, Honestly
 Yes Minister
 Yes, Prime Minister
 Yes, Virginia, there is a Santa Claus
 Yo Gabba Gabba!
 Yoho Ahoy
 Yoko! Jakamoko! Toto!
 You Can Write Anything
 You Can't Do That on Television
 Young Dracula
 The Young Person's Guide to Becoming a Rock Star
 The Young Ones (later moved to Ten)
 Your Life in Their Hands
 Your Living Body
 Your Mother Wouldn't Like It

Z

 The Zack Files
 Zardip's Search for Healthy Wellness
 Zoey 101
 Zombie College
 Zombie Hotel
 Zoo 2000
 Zoo Olympics
 Zoo Quest
 Zoom the White Dolphin (later moved to SBS)
 Z-Cars

See also

 List of live television plays broadcast on Australian Broadcasting Corporation (1950s)
 List of programs broadcast by Network 10
 List of programs broadcast by Nine Network
 List of programs broadcast by Special Broadcasting Service
 List of programs broadcast by Seven Network
 List of Australian television series

References

External links

ABC programs
 
Australian Broadcasting Corporation